= Philippe Millereau =

French Mannerist painter

- Born: Around 1570
- Died: 1610; Paris
- Movement: School of Fontainebleau

Philippe Millereau (French pronunciation: [filip milʁo]; c. 1570–1610) was a French Mannerist painter of the late 16th and early 17th centuries, active during the reign of Henri IV, and assimilated to the Second School of Fontainebleau, of which he remained a relatively minor figure; he was clearly influenced by Toussaint Dubreuil, but also by Italian artists such as Nicolò dell'Abbate, and Flemish painters. Art historians see him as a "petit maître" (small master) of this period.

== Biography ==
A little-known artist, except for the most comprehensive research by Charles Sterling and Sylvie Béguin, Millereau has remained associated with the second Fontainebleau school.

Born into a family of painters, probably of Champagne origin, he settled in Paris, and married a certain Louise Belanger (or Beranger), with whom he had two children: Jean (born 7 August 1600) and Marie (born 17 March 1605, died before 1611, as she does not appear on her father's death certificate). His son Jean II Millereau, as well as his brother Jean I Millereau, were also painters. The course of his career is unknown. In 1600, he lived in rue du Temple, parish of Saint-Nicolas, Paris, and was listed as "master painter in Saint-Germain-des-Prés" in 1602. On 13 August 1602, he signed a four-year lease for a house in front of the Saint-Germain market in Paris, while his two children were baptized in the church of Saint-Sulpice in 1606 and 1607. His children's godparents included Jean Millereau, Daniel Berthin and Louis Poirier.

He appears to have taught his art, with an apprenticeship contract signed on 10 February 1604 in favor of Bernard de Mialle. His presence is attested in Reims in 1609. He died the following year in Paris. He was buried on 10 April 1610 in the church of Saint-Sulpice. The inventory of his possessions after his death, drawn up on 10 June 1611, listed several of the painter's paintings: Une dame et plusieurs déesses, Deux têtes peintes, Jugement de Michel Lange dépeint sur une carte de papier. The inventory also revealed the painter's modest living conditions.

== Works and influences ==
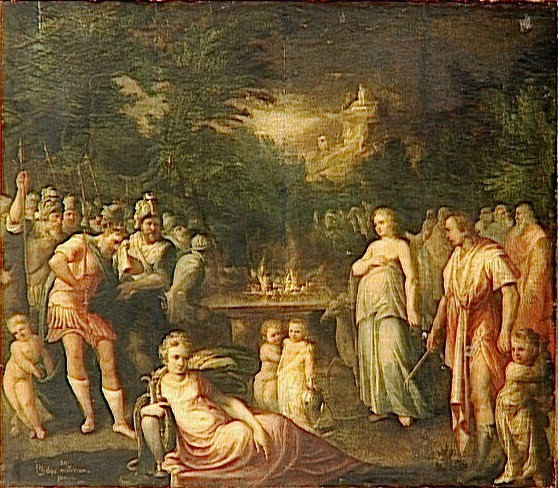
Le sacrifice d'Iphigénie, oil on wood, Fontainebleau, Musée National du Château.

Only three paintings by him are known, all with mythological subjects and set in a landscape: Le sacrifice d'Iphigénie (Fontainebleau, Musée National du Château), Vénus, Vulcain et l'Amour (Venus, Vulcan and Love), sometimes called Thétis priant Vulcain de forger les armes de son fils (oil on wood, Reims, Musée des Beaux-Arts, from the former Hôtel de l'Abbaye d'Avenay, where the painting was used as a mantelpiece), and Cérès et Bacchus (Châlons-en-Champagne, Musée des Beaux-Arts et d'Archéologie). A fourth painting, recently found and acquired by the French Centre des Monuments Nationaux for the Château d'Azay-le-Rideau museum, could be attributed to him on stylistic grounds: La Vision de Constantin. The name of Jacob Bunel has also been put forward as a possible author of this composition.

=== Le sacrifice d'Iphigénie ===
Philippe Millereau's most famous painting is Le Sacrifice d'Iphigénie (oil on wood, Fontainebleau, Musée National du Château), seen by Charles Sterling in 1936 in a private collection in Paris, acquired in 1937 by the Château de Fontainebleau, and presented at the exhibition on the Fontainebleau School at the Grand Palais in 1972–1973. Illustrating all the painter's influences, both in its references to Toussaint Dubreuil and to Italian (Nicolò dell'Abbate) and Flemish artists, this medium-sized, relatively well-preserved painting provides an overview of his art and style.

Immersed in a dark, dense forest landscape, the sacrificial altar stands at the center of the composition. In the foreground, a marine allegory lies on the ground (probably from the port of Aulis, where the scene takes place), holding a silver ewer. Behind her, small children, typical of Millereau's compositions, precede Iphigénie, dressed in a blue tunic, on the right. Opposite, on the other side of the altar, her father King Agamemnon, dressed in a tight reddish cuirass (a commonplace in the warrior costumes of the second Fontainebleau school) is already lamenting, not far from his soldiers, ready to depart. Millereau chose to depict the scene of Iphigénie's Sacrifice in a moment of transition: the left-hand side seems to illustrate the situation preceding the torture, showing the king collapsed by this sacrifice, while the right-hand side shows the happy outcome of the myth. Iphigenia (who can also be identified with Diana herself), stands beside a deer (symbol of the goddess), which will replace the young princess on the altar, allowing the Achaeans to sail towards Troy, thanks to the winds once again becoming favorable. The priest, standing to the right of the composition, and the audience watch in amazement. The priest's red cloak responds to Agamemnon's breastplate, as do the two children standing next to them, who close the scene, acting as repulsive figures leading the viewer's gaze towards the children at the center of the painting.

=== A Parisian painter at the crossroads of influences ===
Philippe Millereau seems to have closely followed the career of Toussaint Dubreuil, judging by the resemblance of certain types, and by the treatment of costumes and drapery folds (parallel or funnel-shaped), found in both painters. This filiation is particularly visible in Cérès et Bacchus (where the same types of figures are found), and in Le Sacrifice d'Iphigénie (where the same types of costumes and similar treatment of drapery are observed). However, Millereau doesn't match Dubreuil's talent, and "takes his inspiration from Dubreuil with a familiar, slightly provincial grace". It is possible that Millereau worked with Dubreuil's team on the restoration of the Galerie d'Ulysse at the Château de Fontainebleau, and was thus led to copy and draw some of Primaticcio's frescoes. Sterling attributes to Millereau a drawing, Le Retour d'Ulysse, sold in Berlin in 1931 under the name of Primaticcio.

Millereau also followed the heritage of Nicolò dell'Abbate, the Italian painter of the first Fontainebleau school, notably in his landscape art (in which Millerau also borrowed from Dubreuil and Ambroise Dubois), particularly visible in Venus, Vulcain, et l'Amour, where the landscape in the background, the slightly elongated figures and the warm colors (reds combined with deep greens) are reminiscent of the work of Nicolò dell'Abate. The head of Venus is reminiscent of one of the women in La Continence de Scipion (Paris, Musée du Louvre), by the Italian painter, while the naiad in the foreground of Le Sacrifice d'Iphigénie (thought to be an allegory of the port of Aulis where the scene is set) adopts a posture similar to the spring visible in the foreground of Le Rapture de Proserpine by dell'Abate. In Le Sacrifice d'Iphigénie, the theatrical lighting of the landscape and the impasto on the foliage once again recall Niccolo's work.

Finally, Sterling draws a third connection, this time linking Millereau to Flemish painting. This association is due in particular to the artist's somewhat theatrical, magical landscapes, illuminated by a dreamlike, mysterious light, sometimes found in northern painters (among whom Sterling cites Pieter Schoubroeck, Anthonie Mirou and Frederick van Valckenborgh). Sterling describes him as "a small, personal master, with a grace less prim than Dubreuil's, and a kind of health that makes him somewhat akin to the Italianized Flemish of his time", and compares him to Jérôme Francken, or Hendrick van Balen, for his treatment of the plump little children in Le Sacrifice d'Iphigénie. Frans Floris, Hendrik Goltzius and Abraham Bloemaert are also possible models. The support of his paintings (wood) also recalls the northern schools.

Sterling's study concludes with the observation that Millereau, while remaining attached to the second Fontainebleau school, differs slightly from it thanks to his multiple inspirations, and a singular style. Sterling states that "this familiar touch, combined with an easy grace and a calm, static composition, gives Millereau's painting Le Sacrifice d'Iphigénie a certain authority, setting it apart from the dancing agitation of the second school. It relieves us of the often gratuitous artifices of this school".

Although his work bears witness to the influence of Bellifontains artists on Parisian painting of the period, Philippe Millereau remains a "petit maître" of French painting, and his life, still little known and poorly documented, does not allow one to confidently define his work, and his role in French painting of the early 17th century.

== List of works ==
Painting	Title	Date	Dimensions	Notes	Place of preservation
	Le Sacrifice d'Iphigénie		81 × 91 cm	oil on wood. Signed "Philippe Millereau pinxit".	Fontainebleau, musée national du château
	Vénus, Vulcain, et l'Amour	1609	78 × 148 cm	oil on wood. Signed: Philipes Millereau, inventor et pinxit, 1609. Donated to the museum by J.Boullaire, 1875.	Reims, musée des beaux-arts
	Cérès et Bacchus		80 × 133 cm	oil on wood. Signed: Philippe Millereau pinxit. Gift to the museum by Baptiste Lemaire	Châlons-en-Champagne, musée des beaux-arts et d'Archéologie
	La Vision de Constantin		121 × 155 cm	oil on canvas (attributed to Philippe Millereau or Jacob Bunel)	Azay-le-Rideau, musée du château

- Le retour d'Ulysse, drawing, (Count R de V sale, 4–6 May 1931, Berlin, under the name Primaticcio, reported by Charles Sterling as a probable work by Millereau)

== See also ==
- School of Fontainebleau

== Bibliography ==
- Béguin, Sylvie (1960). L'École de Fontainebleau. Écoles de la peinture (in French). Paris: Editions d'art Gonthier-Seghers..
- Béguin, Sylvie; Chastel, André (1972). École de Fontainebleau (catalogue d'exposition au Grand Palais, Paris, 17 octobre 1972 – 15 janvier 1973) (in French). Paris: Éditions des musées nationaux..
- Kazerouni, Guillaume, in: Béguin, Sylvie; Piccinini, Francesca, Nicolo dell'Abate : storie dipinte nella pittura del Cinquecento tra Modena e Fontainebleau (in Italian), cat. exp. Modène, Foro Boario, 2005, Milan, Silvana, 2005 (pp.459–461).
- Sterling, Charles (1953). "Quelques œuvres inédites des peintres Millereau, Lallemand, Vignon, Saquespée et Simon François". Bulletin de la Société de l'histoire de l'art français (in French): 105–107.
- Véron-Denise, Danièle, Peinture pour un château – Cinquante tableaux (XVIe – XIXe siècle) des collections du château de Fontainebleau (in French), catalogue d'exposition, Réunion des Musées Nationaux, Paris, 1998, pp. .–42-43.
- Peintures des musées et des églises de Châlons-en-Champagne: 25 ans de restauration, cat. exp. Châlons-en-Champagne, 20 juin – 22 septembre 1997 (in French).
