= Master of Flora =

French painter

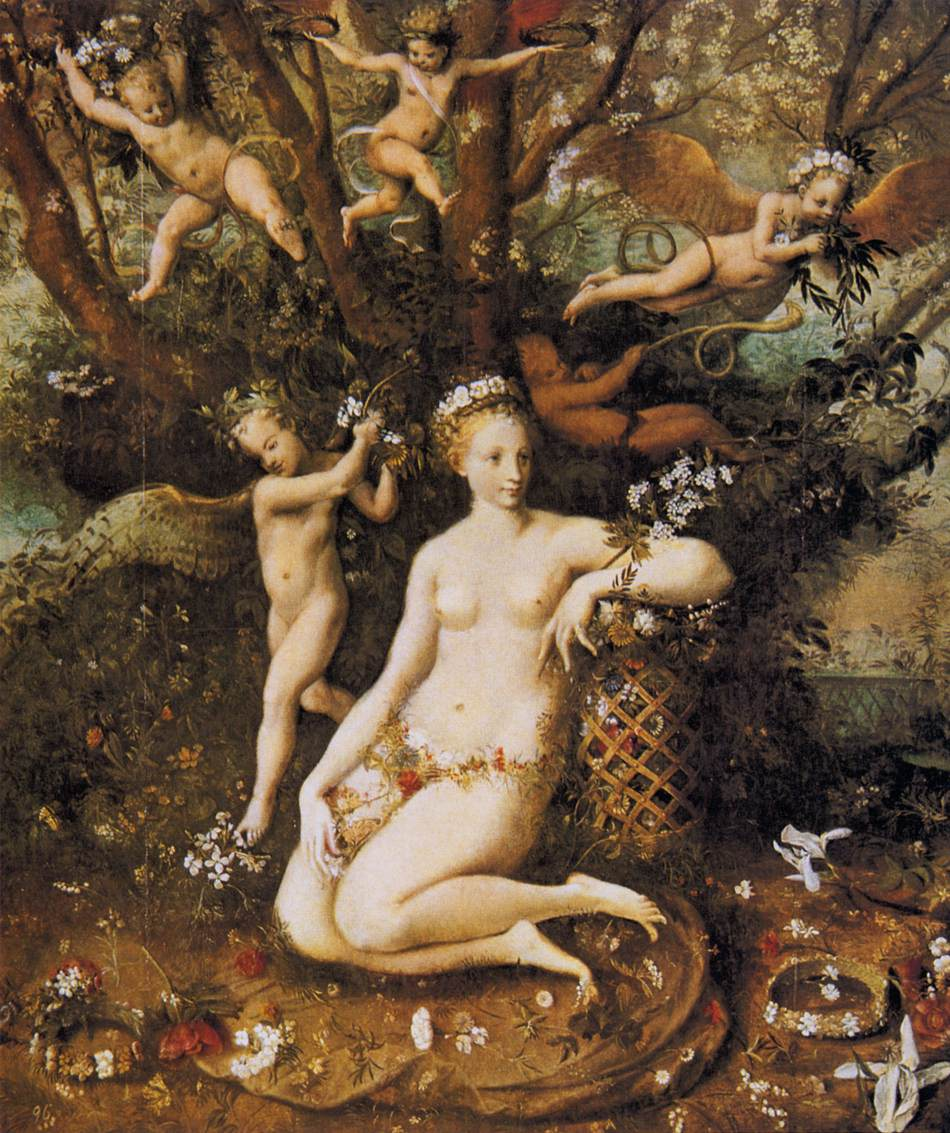
The Triumph of Flora

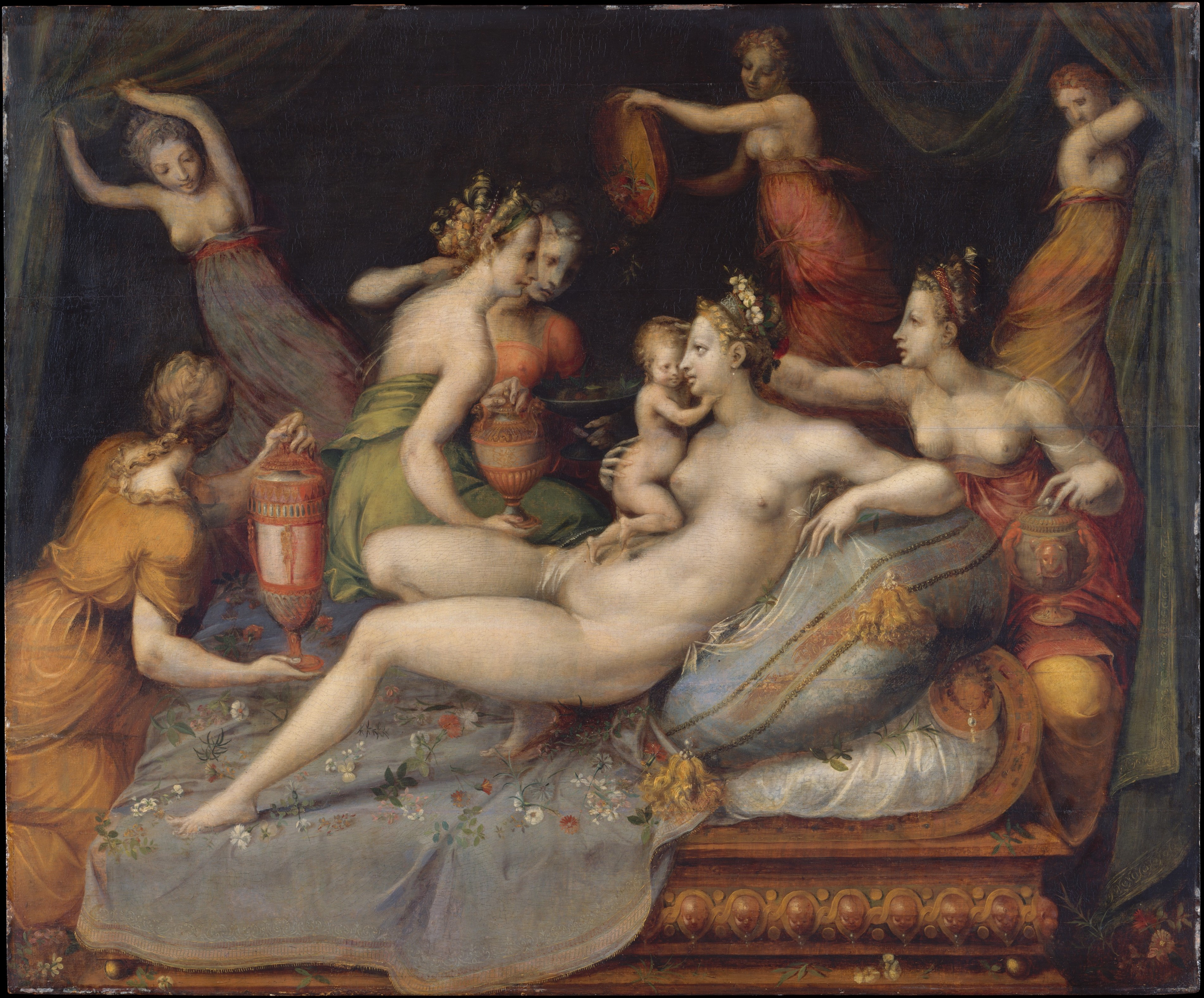
The Birth of Cupid

The Master of Flora was a French painter, associated with the School of Fontainebleau, who was active in the middle of the 16th century.

== Works ==
The notname, "Master of Flora", is used to designate a still unclearly defined artistic personality, first proposed by the art historian Charles Sterling and later expanded upon by Sylvie Béguin, involving a corpus of related works in the style of the School of Fontainebleau. The term is derived from a painting that is now in the collection of the Fine Arts Museums of San Francisco, previously identified as Flora, but now reclassified as a "Venus".

Several more paintings have been added to the unknown Master's potential opus, including a "Birth of Amor/Cupid" (Metropolitan Museum of Art), "Charity" (Louvre Museum) and two versions of the "Birth of Adonis", one at the Pushkin Museum and the other at the Norton Simon Museum, although the latter has also been ascribed to Jean Cousin the Younger. There is an "Artemisia" that has also been credited to a follower of Ambroise Dubois. A copy of "Concert", painted by Francesco Primaticcio (Le Primatice), in the ballroom of the Château de Fontainebleau, is now attributed to the Master of Flora and indicates that he may have worked under his direction.

All of the works so far attributed feature female figures with elongated bodies, long fingers, and feet with upturned toes.

Several drawings have also been proposed as possible candidates for his work: a "Cephalus and Procris" (Morgan Library), an "Annunciation" (Albertina), and an "Apollo and the Muses" (Louvre). In 1578, he may have been commissioned by Count Antoine III de Clermont to complete a work begun by someone else years before.

Several candidates for being the Master have been suggested; Jean Cousin the Younger, whose life and works are poorly documented, and other artists who worked with Le Primatrice or Nicolo dell'Abate, such as Giulio Camillo dell'Abate (Nicolo's son) and Ruggiero de Ruggieri, another artist about whom little is known.
