= Marguerite Bahuche =

French woman painter

- Born: Tours, France
- Died: July 13, 1632
- Occupation: Painter
- Spouse: Jacob Bunel

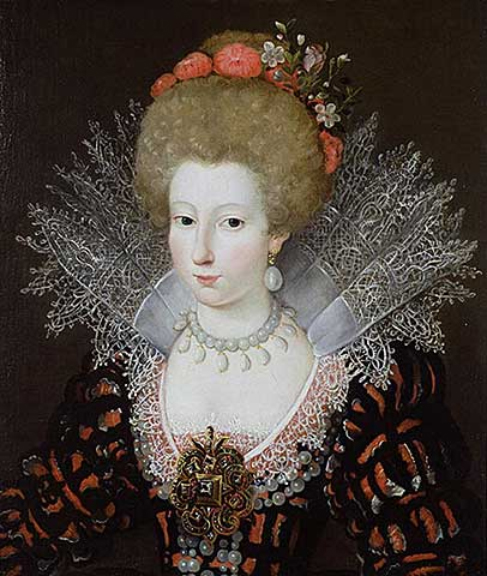
Portrait of a Lady in a high lace collar and jewelled silk costume by Marguerite Bunel. Identified as Catherine of Mayenne (1585-1618).

Marguerite Bahuche, also sometimes called Marguerite Bunel (born during the second half of the 16th century in Tours - died July 13, 1632) was a French woman painter, specialising in portraits, especially of women.

== Biography ==
Marguerite Bahuche was the daughter of Pierre Bahuche, merchant and Protestant painter, and Judith Foubert. Her sister was Marie Bahuche, wife of Pierre Boulle, himself an uncle of the cabinetmaker André Charles Boulle.

She married the painter Jacob Bunel (1558-1614) who was perhaps his master, in any case his collaborator.

Jacob Bunel lived in Tours at the time of his marriage, and the couple moved to Paris afterwards, where they were active in 1599. As early as 1600, Jacob Bunel was employed by the king Henry IV for the decorations of the Tuileries Palace, and probably as early as 1603 for the decorations of the Little Gallery of the Louvre (now the "Galerie d'Apollon", completely rebuilt at the beginning of Louis XIV's reign), replacing Toussaint Dubreuil who had just died. They also obtained a lodging under the great gallery of the Louvre, as an artist protected by the king. Marguerite Bahuche joined him to decorate the bays of the gallery with 28 portraits of kings and queens of France, from Saint Louis to Henry IV, and the decoration of the ceiling, with mythological scenes (completely destroyed during the fire of 1661, and known by rare preparatory drawings).

Widowed in October 1614, she received from the regent Marie de' Medici the title of royal painter and that of inspector and curator of the galleries of paintings in the Louvre and the Tuileries.

In September 1618, she remarried Paul Galland, then secretary to the king, future king's counselor and collector of the sizes in the city of Tours. However, she maintained her activity as a painter, at least until 1625.

She died on July 13, 1632, and was buried in the Protestant cemetery of Charenton. She bequeathed her drawings to her nephews, Jean Bahuche and Isaac Bernier. Her second husband, Paul Galland, remarried on October 9, 1632.
