= Martin Fréminet =

French painter

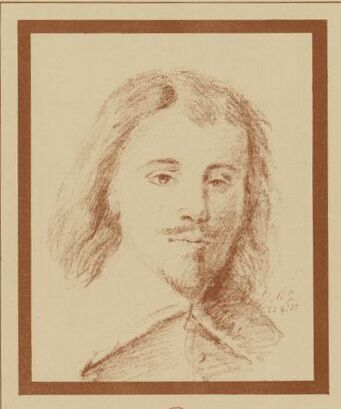
- self-portrait
- Born: 29 September 1567; Paris
- Died: 18 June 1619; Paris
- Occupations: Painter, copper engraver, drawer, printmaker
- Children: Louis Fréminet
- Father: Médéric Fréminet

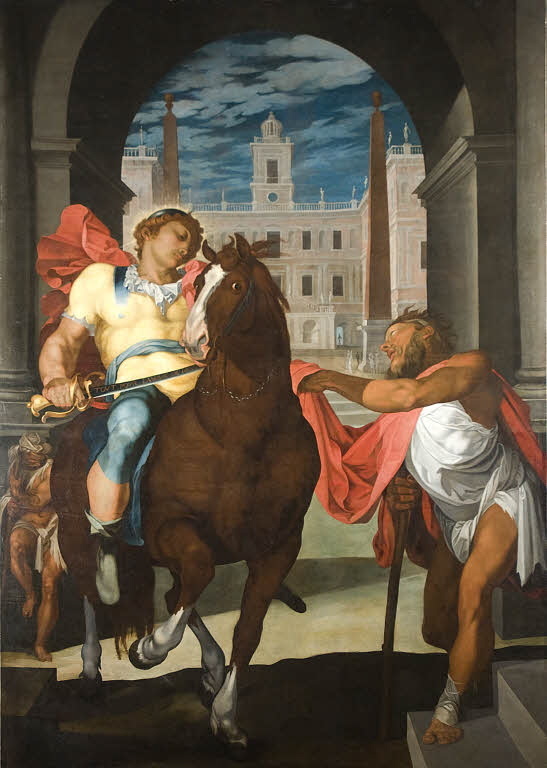
St. Martin sharing his cloak by cutting a piece off to give to the beggar, now in the Louvre

Martin Fréminet (French pronunciation: [maʁtɛ̃ fʁeminɛ]; 24 September 1567 – 18 June 1619) was a French historical painter. Fréminet was born and died in Paris. According to the RKD he was a painter and engraver who is considered a member of the Second "School of Fontainebleau". Several of his ceiling decorations at the Palace of Fontainebleau survive.

== Biography ==
Fréminet was born in Paris in 1567. He received his first instruction from his father, a tapestry designer. He soon made some progress in his career in Paris, and executed several commissions, including a picture of St. Sebastian for the church of St. Joseph. But in 1592 he set out to Italy. At this time the controversies raised by the Naturalists were at their height, and into them Fréminet entered with ardour. His time was chiefly passed in Rome, Parma, and Venice, and he directed his most serious attention to the works of Parmigiano, Cavalier d'Arpino and Michelangelo the study of the latter having a great influence on him.

After about sixteen years in Italy he returned to his native country of France by way of Lombardy and Savoy, and in the latter he painted some important works for the Ducal Palace. His fame had preceded him, for after the death of Toussaint Du-Breuil in 1602, and Étienne Dumonstier II in 1603 he was appointed by Henry IV of France to be his principal painter, obtaining at the same time by purchase a sinecure post in the court. In 1608 he commenced the decoration of the chapel of the Trinity at the Palace of Fontainebleau, for the king, which was executed in oil on plaster. In the five compartments of the ceiling he depicted Noah entering the Ark, the Fall of the Angels, Our Lord in Glory, the Angel Gabriel, and the Creation. Behind the altar he painted the Annunciation, and he also executed other frescoes representing kings, prophets, &c., and scenes from the life of Christ. This masterpiece was not finished until the succeeding reign of King Louis XIII, and on its completion, in 1615, Fréminet received the cross of the Order of St. Michael a high honor of loyalty for a knight from his King.

Fréminet died in Paris in 1619, and was buried, in accordance with his desire, near Fontainebleau, for which he had painted several pictures, which were destroyed when that Abbey was burnt in 1793. He left a son Louis, who followed in his father's footsteps as a painter. The poet Mathurin Régnier was his friend, and dedicated to him his tenth Satire. Fréminet had a good knowledge of architectural perspective and of anatomy, though his aspirations after the grandeur of Michelangelo frequently led him into exaggerations, and have caused him to be much decried. To do him justice, however, it must be owned that he marks a great advance in the history of the French school. The works of his predecessor, Jean Cousin, were influenced by Italian art, and so too was Fréminet. He is seen at his best in those works in which the spirit of Parmigiano is most apparent. His style of working was singular: he painted a picture in separate portions, without sketching or designing the rest of the composition.

== Second School of Fontainbleau ==
In 1531, King Francis I of France launched a campaign to restore a small hunting lodge in the Forest of Bièvre, he hired many artists, architects and artisans and the lodge became known as the Palace of Fontainebleau. So was the creation of the First School of Fountainebleu, some of these first artists brought with them a Mannerist style influenced by Michelangelo, the first school continued and became extremely prominent but in 1547 after the death of Francis I royal patronage of the school stopped. Until 1589 with the ascension of Henry IV of France so in 1594 the Second School of Fontainebleau began. Founding artists of the Second School of Fontainbleau included Ambroise Dubois, Toussaint Dubreuil and Martin Fréminet, their works of art were characterized by greater solidity of figure, depth of composition, the use of contrasting light and shadow, and the strong gradations of bold, rich color. These characteristics allude to the emergence of the Baroque style in the early seventeenth century.
