= Jan de Hoey =

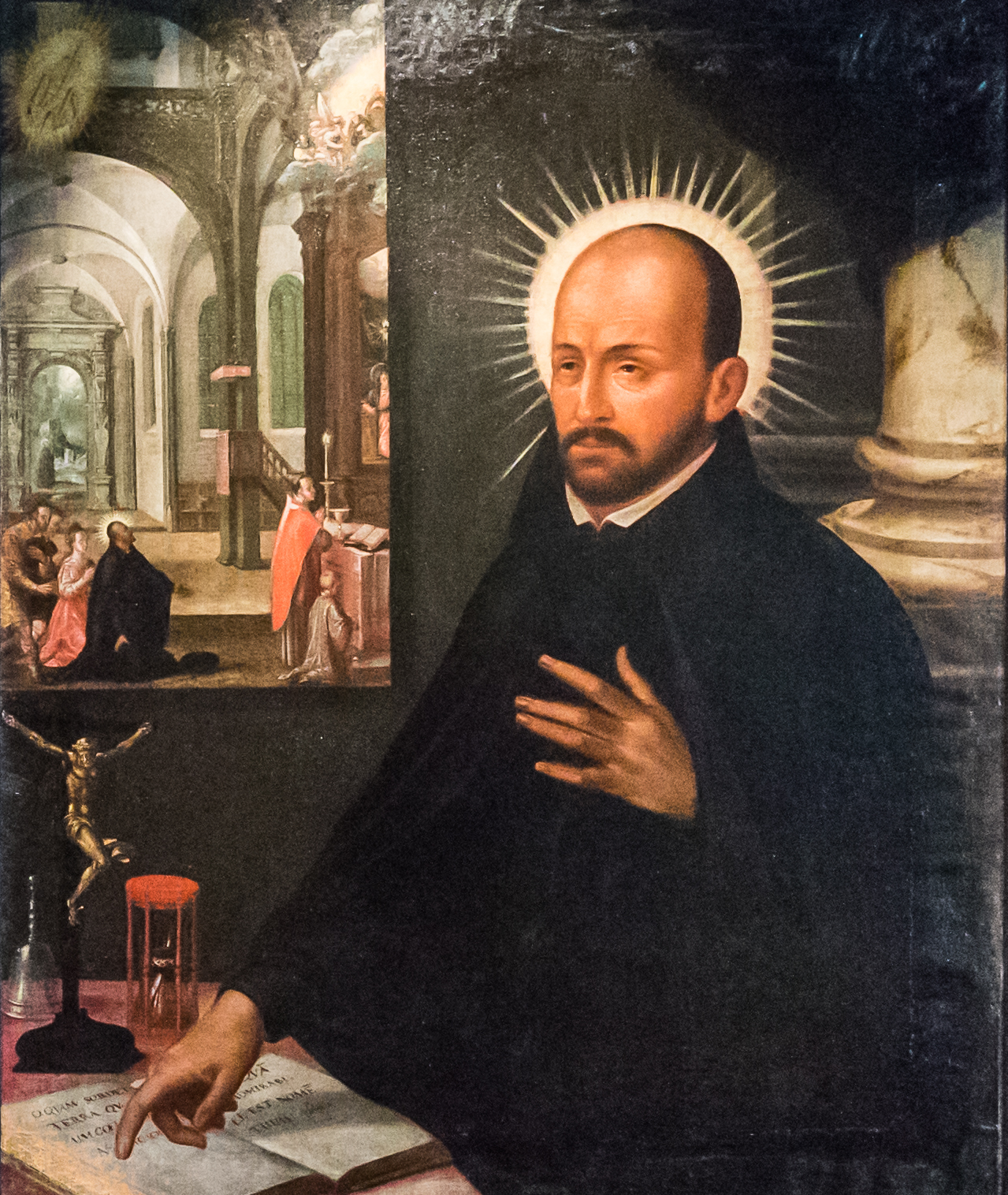
Portrait of Ignatius de Loyola (after 1600)

Jan Dammeszoon de Hoey, or Jean de Hoey (c.1545, Leiden - 8 September 1615, Avon) was a Netherlandish painter who worked at the court of King Henry IV; associated with the School of Fontainebleau. He is best known for his history paintings.

== Biography ==
He was born in what was then the Habsburg Netherlands. His father, Dammes Claeszoon de Hoey (? - 1560) was also a painter. His mother, Maritgen Lucasdochter, was the daughter of Lucas van Leyden.

His training as a painter began in Utrecht, under his elder brother, Lucas Dammeszoon de Hoey (1533 - c.1604). Later, in France, he studied under Hieronymus Francken, who was working on decorations at the Palace of Fontainebleau.

Around 1571, he settled in Troyes. In 1578, he married Maria Ricovery (?-1607), granddaughter of the Italian-born painter, Domenico del Barbiere. They had four sons, one of whom died as an infant, and one daughter.

In 1585, he left Troyes to attend to his career at the Royal Court. In 1592, he was retained by King Henry IV as a court painter and chamberlain. This made him responsible for managing the King's art collection at the palace. He would hold that position until 1608. During this period, he and Maria settled in Avon, where he remained for the rest of his life.

In 1608, together with Ambroise Dubois, he worked at the Château de Fontainebleau, on the restoration of paintings and frescoes; producing large paintings for the upper chapel of the château.

He died at the age of seventy and was interred at the Abbey of Barbeau, which was demolished in 1837. His son, Claude (1585-1660), succeeded him at court.
