= Jacob Bunel =

French painter

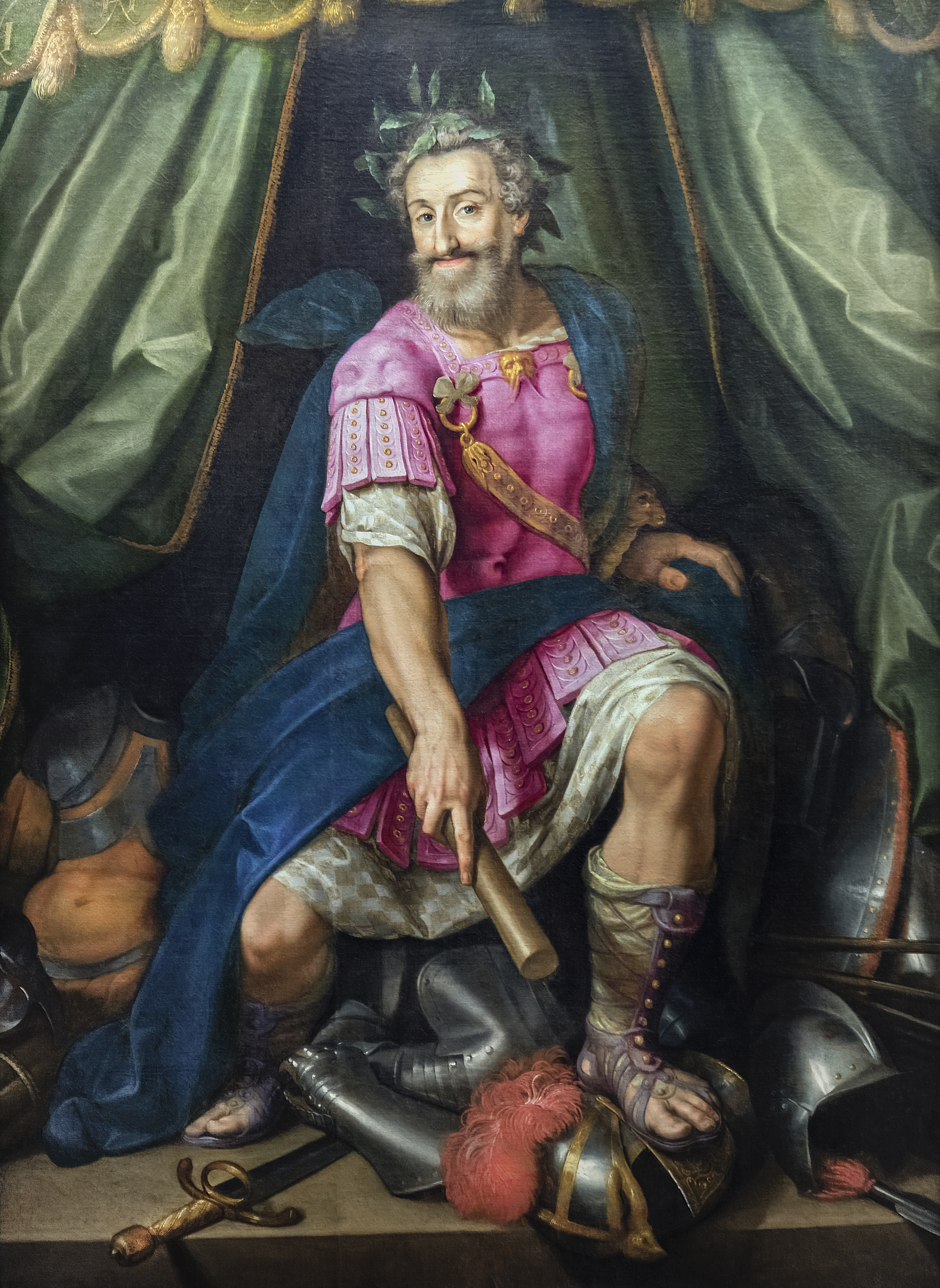
Portrait of Henry IV

Jacob Bunel (c.1558, Blois – 14 October 1614, Paris) was a French painter, associated with the Second School of Fontainebleau.

== Biography ==
He came from a family of artists. His grandfather, Jean (or Jehan), and his father, François, were painters, as was his brother; also named François. He was born a Catholic, and originally named Jacques, but converted to Protestantism sometime in the early 1590s.

After being trained by his father, he left for Spain. There, from 1585 to 1588, he assisted Federico Zuccari and Pellegrino Tibaldi at the construction site for the cloister at the Escorial. When this was completed, he went to Rome to work in Zuccari's studio. At some point, he returned to Blois, where he painted portraits.

He moved to Tours in 1595, where he rented a house and studio and married Marguerite Bahuche, a Protestant. She was also a painter, as was her father, Antoine. In 1599, they moved to Paris, at the request of King Henry IV, in memory of his father, who had served as the King's painter and valet de chambre. He would be employed at the court until his death.

From 1600, he was engaged in painting decorations for the Palais des Tuileries. After 1603, he did similar work at the Louvre, in the "Petite Galerie", replacing Toussaint Dubreuil, who had recently died. Together with his wife, he decorated the aisles of the gallery with 28 portraits of previous Kings and Queens of France, beginning with Saint Louis, and filled the ceiling with mythological scenes. These were destroyed by a fire in 1661, but some preparatory drawings have survived.

From 1608 to 1610, on a commission from Queen Marie de' Medici, he created a painting for the high altar at the new Church of the Feuillants on the Rue du Faubourg-Saint-Honoré, depicting the Assumption of the Virgin. The painting was moved to Bordeaux in 1803, and destroyed by a fire in 1870, during the Franco-Prussian War. There is a story that says Bunel left the painting unfinished because, as a Protestant, he refused to paint the Virgin. It was supposedly finished many years later by Charles de La Fosse.

What is likely his last project took place from 1612 to 1614, when he was part of a group providing decorations for the Grand Cabinet of Marie de' Medici, who was then the Queen Mother, at the Louvre. Other artists participating in the project included Gabriel Honnet, Guillaume Dumée and Ambroise Dubois. His decorations depicted scenes from Jerusalem Delivered by Torquato Tasso.

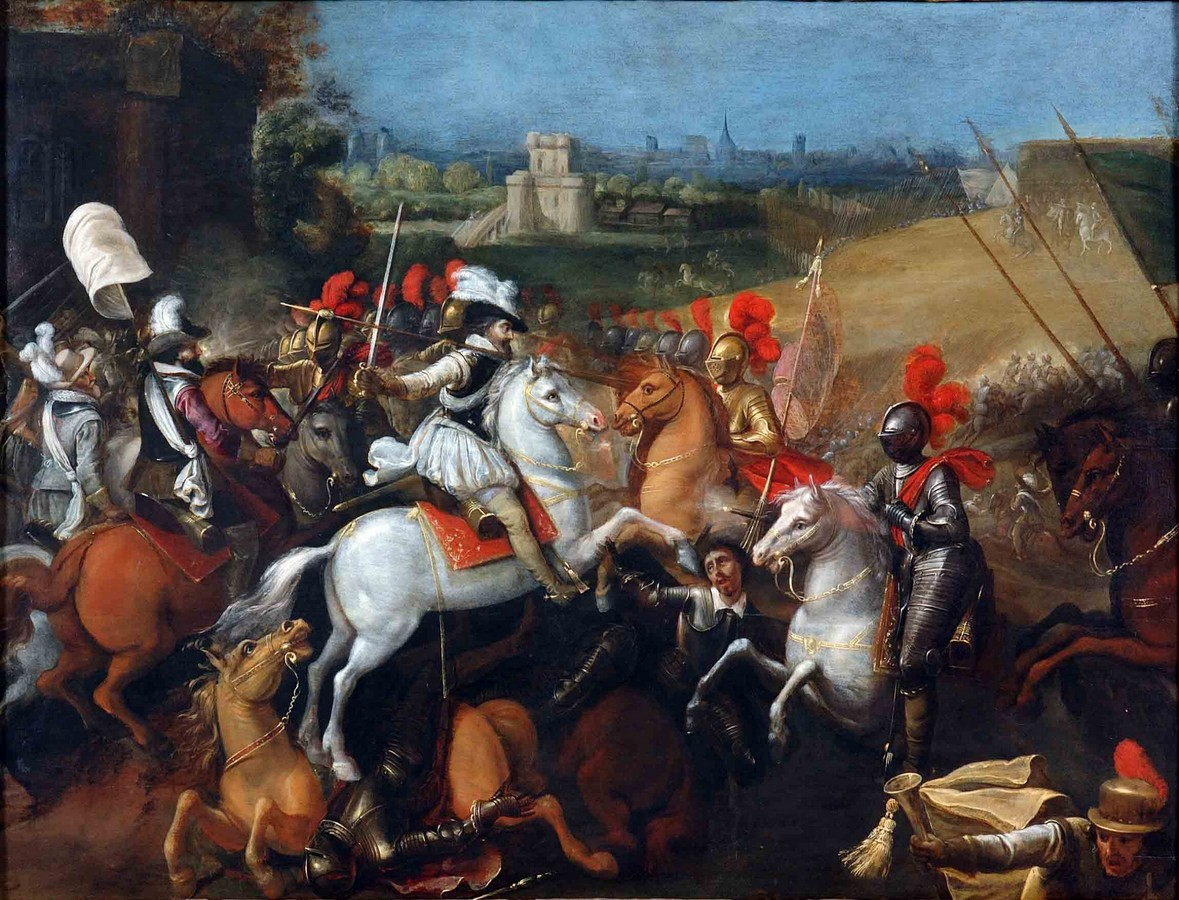
Henry IV at the Battle of Arques
