= Damiano del Barbiere =

Italian stuccoist and sculptor

- Occupations: stuccoist, sculptor

Damiano del Barbiere was an Italian stuccoist and sculptor of the Renaissance period, recruited by Primaticcio to help in the labors at the palace of Fontainebleau.

== See also ==
School of Fontainebleau

== Bibliography ==
- Ticozzi, Stefano (1830). Dizionario degli architetti, scultori, pittori, intagliatori in rame ed in pietra, coniatori di medaglie, musaicisti, niellatori, intarsiatori d'ogni etá e d'ogni nazione' (Volume 1). Milan: Gaetano Schiepatti. pp. 108–9.
