= Diana the Huntress =

Painting by an anonymous painter of the School of Fontainebleau

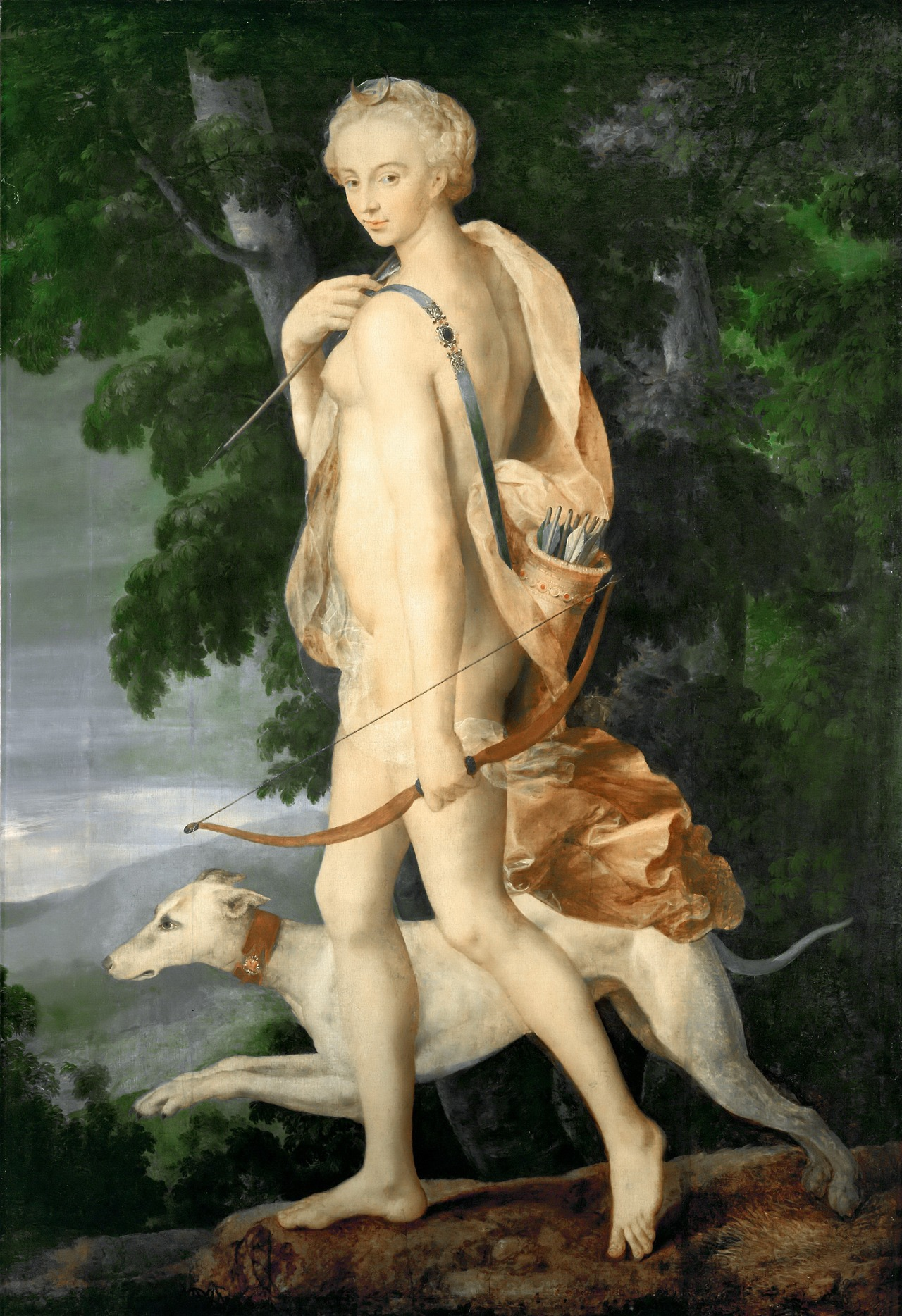
Diana the Huntress, c. 1550, oil on canvas, School of Fontainebleau, 75.25 in x 52 in (191 cm x 132 cm), Musée du Louvre

Diana the Huntress (French: Diane chasseresse) is an oil-on-canvas painting by an anonymous artist of the School of Fontainebleau. Painted in about 1550, it is a mythical representation of Diane de Poitiers, the mistress of King Henry II, in the guise of the goddess Diana. It is in the Louvre, which acquired it in 1840.

In its linear elegance the painting exemplifies the French version of the Northern Mannerist style that was introduced to France by Italian artists such as Rosso Fiorentino and Francesco Primaticcio in the 1530s. It is one of many works by artists of the School of Fontainebleau depicting Diane de Poitiers, who was often personified as Diana, the Roman goddess of the hunt. The nude figure carries a bow and a quiver of arrows, and is accompanied by a dog. In her hair is an ornament in the shape of a crescent moon, an attribute of the goddess.

The painting was previously attributed to the Italian artist Luca Penni.

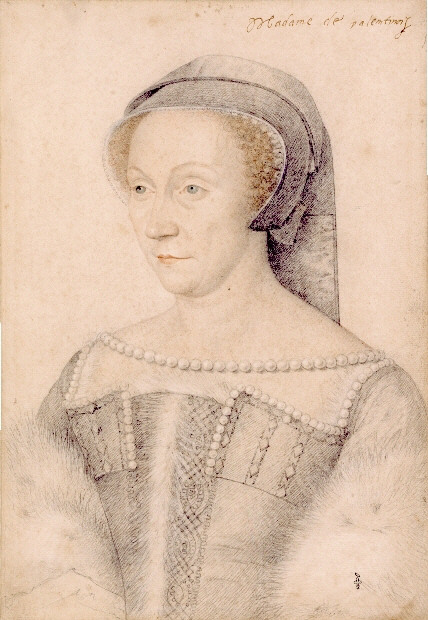
Portrait drawing of Diana de Poitiers, workshop of François Clouet

== Bibliography ==
- Béguin, Sylvie (1960), L'École de Fontainebleau: Le Manierisme à la cour de France, Paris: Éditions d'Art Gonthier-Seghers, OCLC 873929074, 247832967
- Gowing, Lawrence (1987), Paintings in the Louvre, New York: Stewart, Tabori & Chang, ISBN 1-55670-007-5
- Green, C. M. C. (2007), Roman Religion and the Cult of Diana at Aricia, Cambridge University Press, ISBN 978-0521851589
