= Ruggiero de Ruggieri =

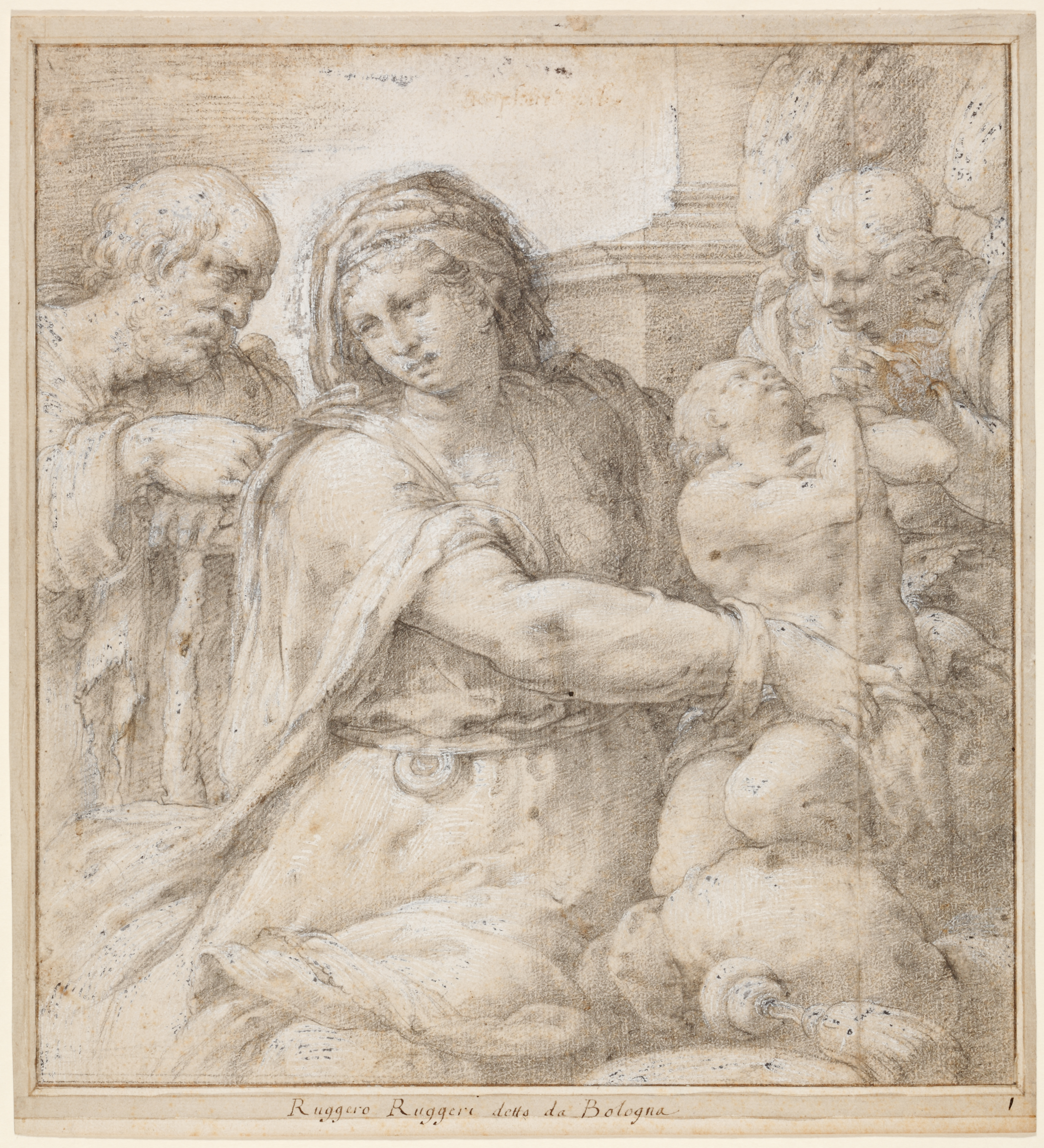
Holy Family with the Angel

Ruggiero de Ruggieri (before 1540, Bologna - 1596/1597, Fontainebleu) was an Italian-born painter associated with the Bolognese school.

== Biography ==
Around 1540, he left Bologna to go to France. The first authenticated reference to him working with Francesco Primaticcio was in 1551; in the King's office and the guard room at the Palace of Fontainebleau. Sometime during 1550–560, he was employed to create decorations for the Château d'Ancy-le-Franc, in the Chamber of Arts and the "Galerie de Pharsale". He is known to have been in Avon on several occasions after 1557. Two years later, he became a permanent resident of Fontainebleau. He also worked in Saint-Germain-en-Laye in 1562.

In 1569, he made copies of several paintings by Primaticcio, from Fontainebleau's Galerie d'Ulysse, for the chateau of Nicolas de Neufville de Villeroy. They have since become dispersed. He is also credited with the models for a tapestry of arabesque gods, commissioned for King Henri II. They have been preserved at the Mobilier National and the Musée des Tissus in Lyon.

Following Primaticcio's death in 1570, Ruggieri took over his functions as "Guard and Governor of the Great Garden of Fontainebleau" while Giulio Camillo Abbati became "Superintendent of Paintings". That same year, he married Marie Mulard, the daughter of Gilles Mulard, Procurator at the Parliament.

From 1580 to 1581, he worked at the Hôtel de Soissons for Catherine de Médicis, together with Jacques Patin. When Abbati died, c.1582, he was named to fill his position, thus taking over all of Primaticcio's former responsibilities at Fontainebleau. In the 1590s, together with Toussaint Dubreuil, his son-in-law, he created a decorative tableau at the "Pavillon des Poêles", based on the theme of Hercules, which disappeared in 1703.
