= Francesco Scibec da Carpi =

16th-century Italian carpenter

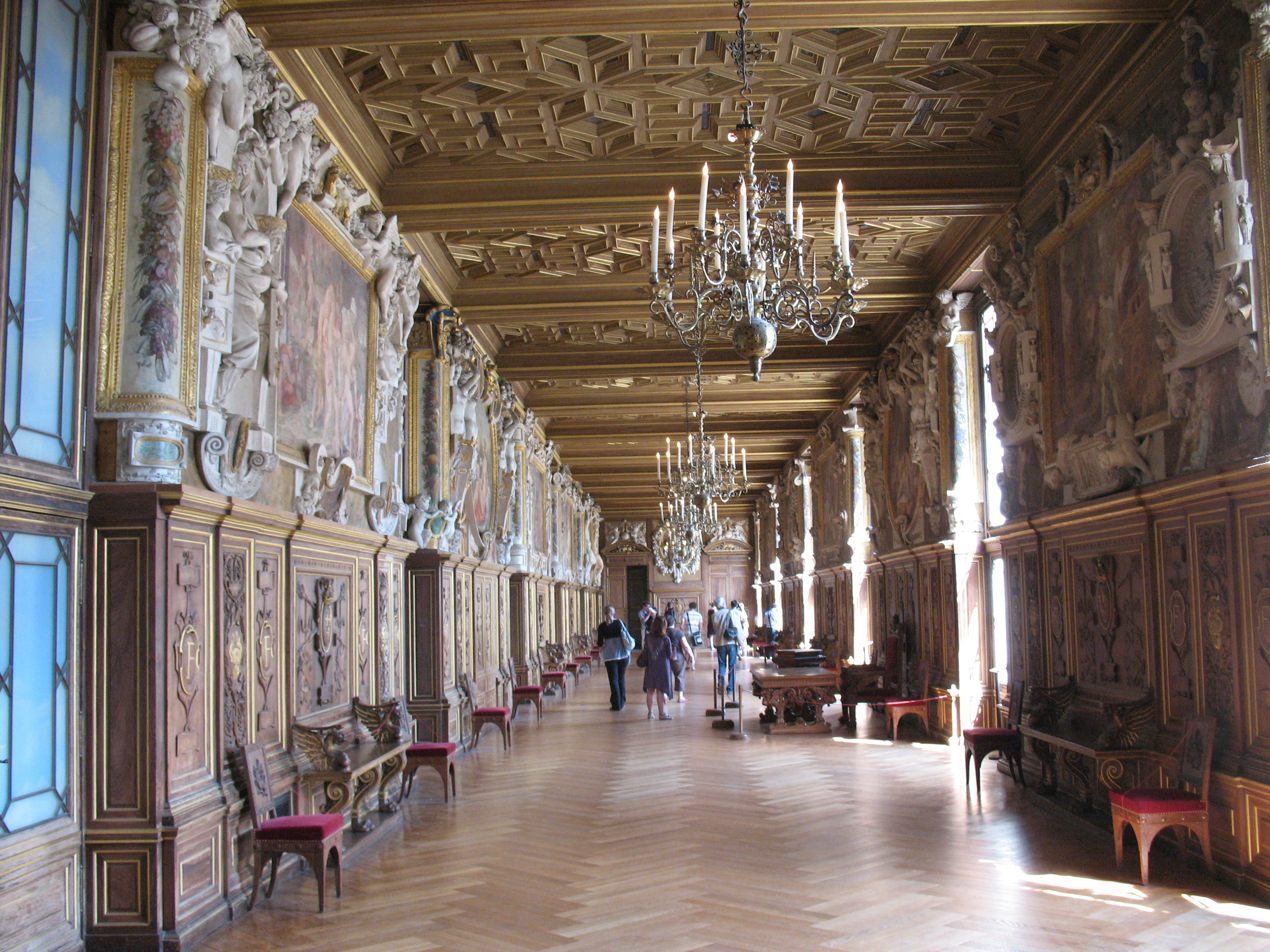
Panelling and ceiling in the Gallerie François Ier at Fontainebleau by Scibec da Carpi

Francesco Scibec, called Scibec da Carpi, was a 16th-century Italian furniture maker from Carpi near Modena. He worked for the French royal court amongst a group of artists now called the first school of Fontainebleau.

Francesco arrived at the building of Fontainebleau for Francis I of France at the same time as his compatriot, Rosso Fiorentino in 1530. There he completed the panelling of the Gallerie François Ier. One of his contracts for the renewed furnishing in oak and walnut of the great gallery and pavilion near the lake at Fontainebleau was made according to the king's personal instructions in February 1541. He also worked at the Château d'Anet for Diane de Poitiers. In 1549 he was contracted to decorate boats for a pageant on the Seine for the entry of Henry II of France to Paris. Francesco also made furniture and panelling for private and ecclesiastical clients.

In July 1552 he accepted as apprentice Bartholomew, the son of another Italian painter colleague at Fontainebleau, Francesco Pellegrini. In the two years from 1557 to 1559 he made furniture for the Louvre, for the Château and the Chapel in the woods of Vincennes, and for the Château of Saint Germain-en-Laye. For Fontainebleau, he made a special picture frame for a map of Italy and other carved frames for the portraits of two ladies.

In March 1537, he married Marguerite Samson, daughter of a French painter, Pierre Samson.
