= Jean Dubois the Elder =

Jean Dubois the Elder, born at Fontainebleau in 1604, a landscape painter and painter to the king, succeeded in 1635 to the office of keeper of the pictures at Fontainebleau before held by his uncle, Claude de Hoey. This office he resigned to his son in 1674, and died at Fontainebleau in 1679. Louis Dubois, his brother, also was keeper of the pictures at Fontainebleau from 1644 to 1651, but resigned on receiving a grant of the pension of 2000 livres which had been enjoyed by Fréminet the younger, his half-brother: Jean Dubois had two sons, Jean and Louls Dubois, born respectively in 1645 and 1646, the elder of whom succeeded to the office of keeper of the pictures which his father resigned in his favour in 1674. Jean died at Fontainebleau in 1694, and Louis at the same place in 1702.
