= Toussaint Dubreuil =

French painter

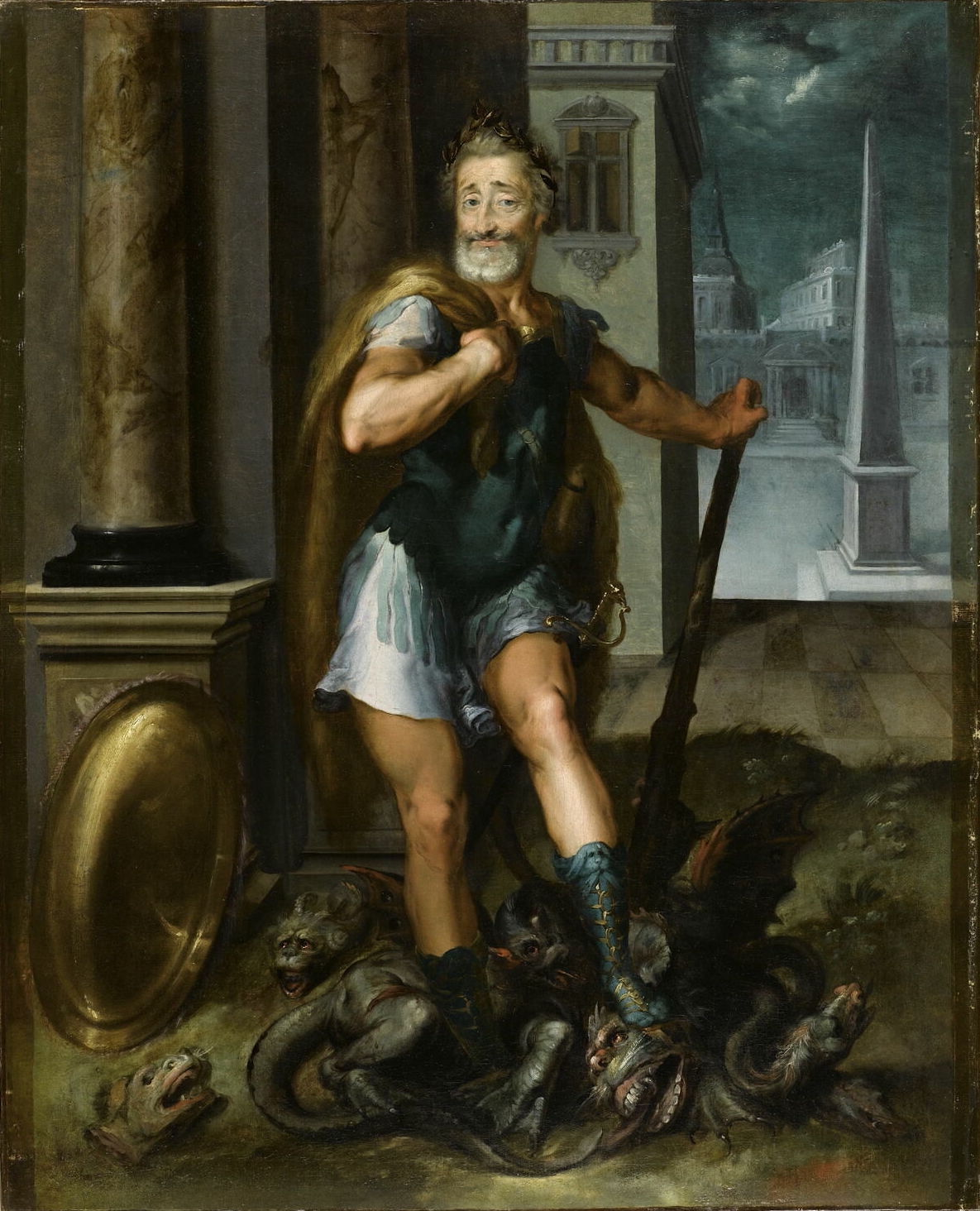
Henry IV as Hercules, slaying the Lernaean Hydra

Toussaint Dubreuil (French pronunciation: [tusɛ̃ dybʁœj]; 1561 – 22 November 1602) was a French painter, associated with the second School of Fontainebleau.

== Biography ==
Dubreuil was born and died in Paris. His father, also named Toussaint, was a saddler, and he maintained a passion for horses throughout his life. He was also an amateur lutist.

He originally trained to be a goldsmith, then studied in Paris with Médéric Fréminet. He studied anatomy with a barber (a profession which then involved performing minor surgery) and provided some illustrations for the Historia anatomica humani corporis, by André du Laurens.

Whether or not he trained in Italy is unknown, but his work shows the influence of Italian Mannerists such as Pellegrino Tibaldi, Bartolomeo Passarotti and Nicolò dell'Abbate.

There is no record of him from 1585 to 1593. He may have received additional training at Fontainebleau; most likely from Ruggiero de Ruggieri, whose daughter he married. Together with Martin Fréminet (his former teacher's son) and Ambroise Dubois, he later helped establish what became known as the Second School of Fontainebleau. He created numerous decorative works for King Henry IV, who appointed him "Ordinary Painter for the King's Tapestries". Few of these decorations have survived.

He also executed large murals for the Château de Fontainebleau, depicting scenes from the story of Hercules. Some of these were done together with his father-in-law, Ruggieri. All but a few fragments have been destroyed. In the Petite Galerie at the Palais du Louvre, together with Jacob Bunel, he painted portraits of Henri IV's predecessors and decorated the ceilings with allegorical subjects. These were destroyed by a fire in 1661.

Following his wife Marie's death in 1598, he remarried; to Dame Marie Champion. She died in 1602, shortly before he died from intestinal damage, caused by riding a violently bucking horse.
