= School of Fontainebleau =

French Renaissance art movement

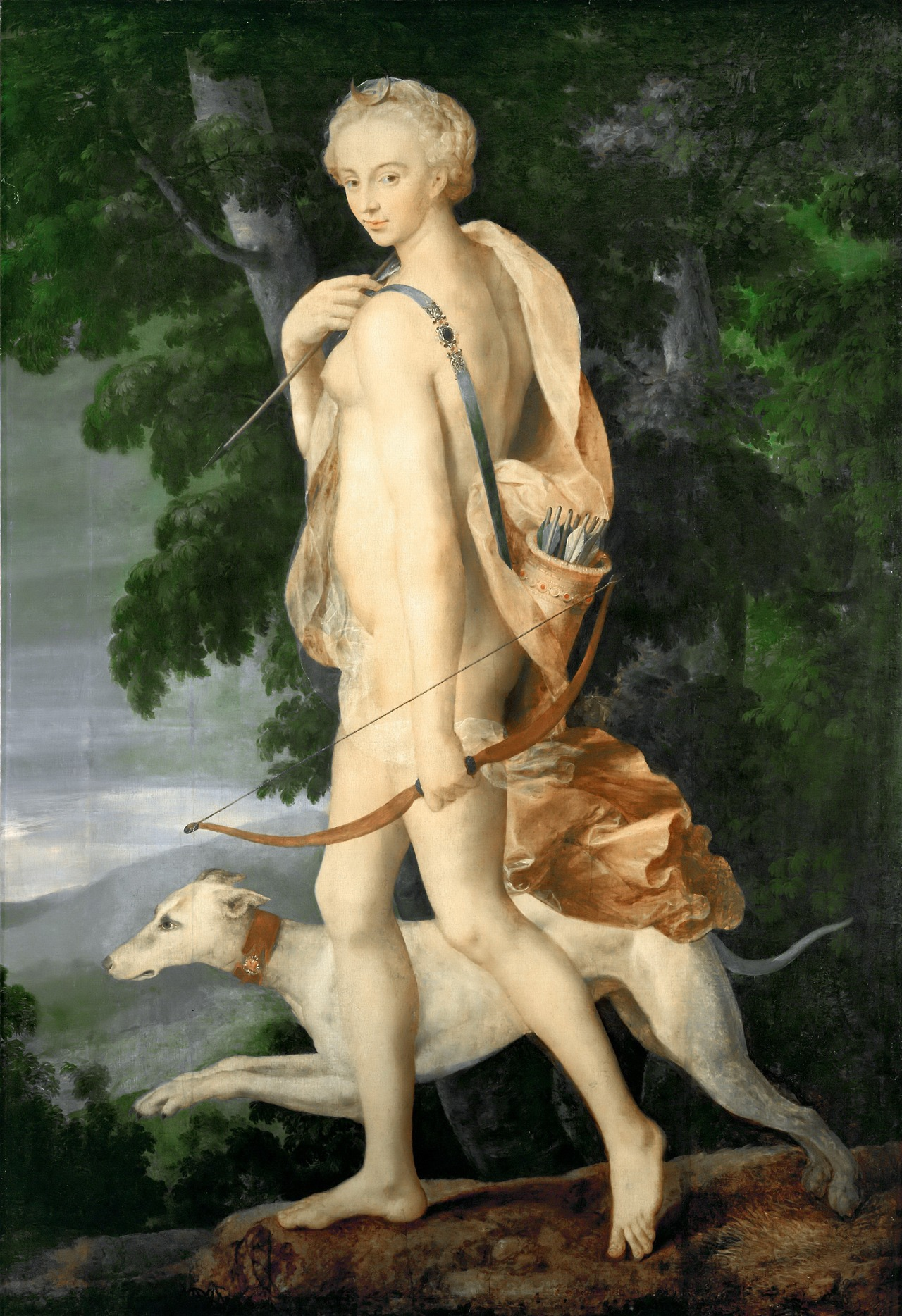
Diana the Huntress - School of Fontainebleau, 1550–1560, (Louvre)

The School of Fontainbleau (French: École de Fontainebleau) (c. 1530 – c. 1610) refers to two periods of artistic production in France during the late French Renaissance centered on the royal Palace of Fontainebleau that were crucial in forming Northern Mannerism, and represent the first major production of Italian Mannerist art in France.

The "First School of Fontainebleau", much more important than the Second School at the end of the century, was based in the chateau from 1531 to 1547, after which some artists moved to Paris or elsewhere.

== First School of Fontainebleau (from 1531) ==
In 1530, the Florentine artist Rosso Fiorentino, having lost most of his possessions at the Sack of Rome in 1527, was invited by François I to come to France, where he began an extensive decorative program for the Château de Fontainebleau. In 1532 he was joined by another Italian artist, Francesco Primaticcio (from Bologna). Rosso killed himself in France in 1540. On the advice of Primaticcio, Niccolò dell'Abbate (from Modena) was invited to France in 1552 by François's son Henri II. Although known for their work at Fontainebleau, these artists were also invited to create works of art for other noble families of the period and were much esteemed and well-paid.

The works of this "first school of Fontainebleau" are characterized by the extensive use of stucco (moldings and picture frames) and frescos, and an elaborate (and often mysterious) system of allegories and mythological iconography. Renaissance decorative motifs such as grotesques, strapwork and putti are common, as well as a certain degree of eroticism. The figures are elegant and show the influence of the techniques of the Italian Mannerism of Michelangelo, Raphael and especially Parmigianino. Primaticcio was also directed to make copies of antique Roman statues for the king, thus spreading the influence of classical statuary.

Many of the works of Rosso, Primaticcio and dell'Abate have not survived; parts of the Chateau were remodelled at various dates. The paintings of the group were reproduced in prints, mostly etchings, which were apparently produced initially at Fontainebleau itself, and later in Paris. These disseminated the style through France and beyond, and also record several paintings that have not survived.

The Mannerist style of the Fontainebleau school influenced French artists (with whom the Italians worked) such as the painter Jean Cousin the Elder, the sculptors Jean Goujon and Germain Pilon, and, to a lesser degree, the painter and portraitist François Clouet the son of Jean Clouet.

=== Printmaking workshop ===
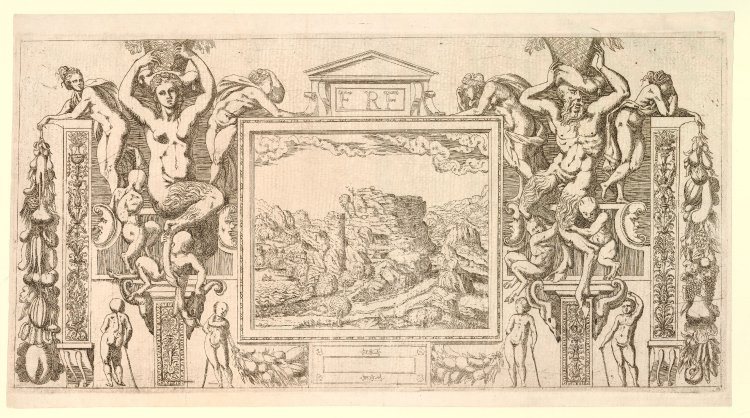
Etching by Antonio Fantuzzi, copying a drawing for this stucco and paint surround at the Palace of Fontainebleau

Although there is no certain proof, most scholars have agreed that there was a printmaking workshop at the Palace of Fontainebleau itself, reproducing the designs of the artists for their works in the palace, as well as other compositions they produced. The most productive printmakers were Léon Davent, Antonio Fantuzzi, and Jean Mignon, followed by the "mysterious" artist known from his monogram as "Master I♀V" (♀ being the alchemical symbol for copper, from which the printing plates were made), and the workshop seems to have been active between about 1542 and 1548 at the latest; François I died in March 1547, after which funding for the palace ended, and the school dispersed. These were the first etchings made in France, and not far behind the first Italian uses of the technique, which originated in Germany. The earliest impressions of all the Fontainebleau prints are in brown ink, and their intention seems to have been essentially reproductive.

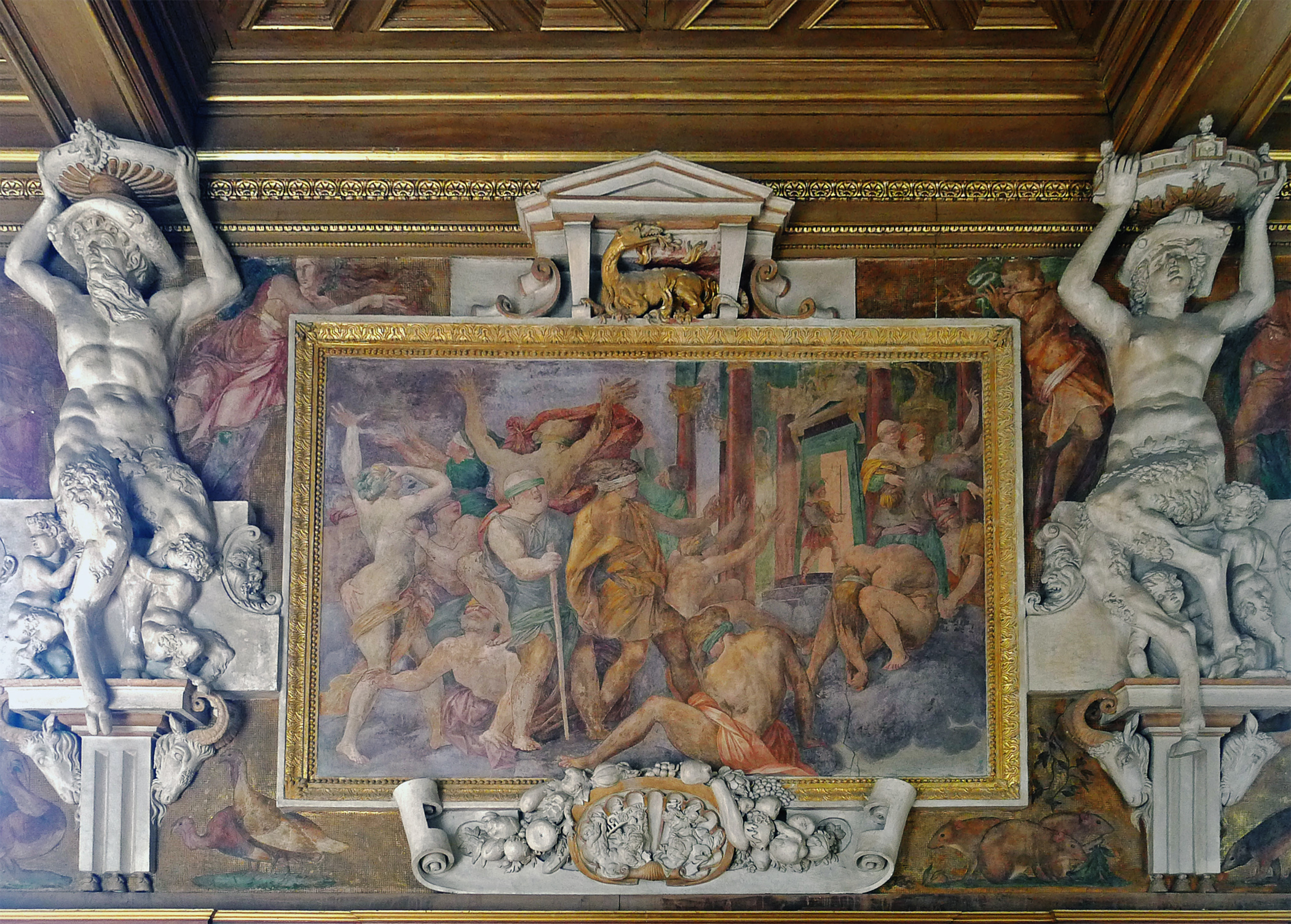
The Enlightenment of Francois I by Rosso Fiorentino, and its surround in the Gallery of Francois I in the palace. A preparatory drawing is copied in the print above.

The intention of the workshop was to disseminate the new style developing at the palace more widely, both to France and to the Italians' peers back in Italy. Whether the initiative to do this came from the king or another patron, or from the artists alone, is unclear. David Landau believes that Primaticcio was the driving force; he had stepped up to become the director of the work at Fontainebleau after the suicide of Rosso Fiorentino in 1540.

The enterprise seems to have been "just slightly premature" in terms of catching a market. The etched prints were often marked by signs of the workshop's inexperience and sometimes incompetence with the technique of etching, and according to Sue Welsh Reed: "Few impressions survive from these plates, and it is questionable whether many were pulled. The plates were often poorly executed and not well printed; they were often scratched or not well polished and did not wipe clean. Some may have been made of metals soft as copper, such as pewter." A broadening market for prints preferred the "highly finished textures" of Nicolas Beatrizet, and later "proficient but ultimately uninspired" engravers such as René Boyvin and Pierre Milan.

=== Notable artists of the first school ===
- Niccolò dell'Abbate (c. 1509–1571) (Italian)
- Damiano del Barbiere, Italian stuccoist and sculptor
- Francesco Scibec da Carpi (died c. 1557) Italian furniture maker, who worked on the boiseries.
- Léon Davent, French etcher
- Antonio Fantuzzi, Italian painter and etcher
- Rosso Fiorentino (Giovanni Battista di Jacopo de' Rossi) (1494–1540) (Italian)
- Juste de Juste (c. 1505–1559) Franco-Italian sculptor and etcher
- Luca Penni (c. 1500/1504–1556) (Italian)
- Francesco Primaticcio (c. 1505–1570) (Italian)
- Léonard Thiry, Flemish, painter and etcher

== Second School of Fontainebleau (from 1594) ==
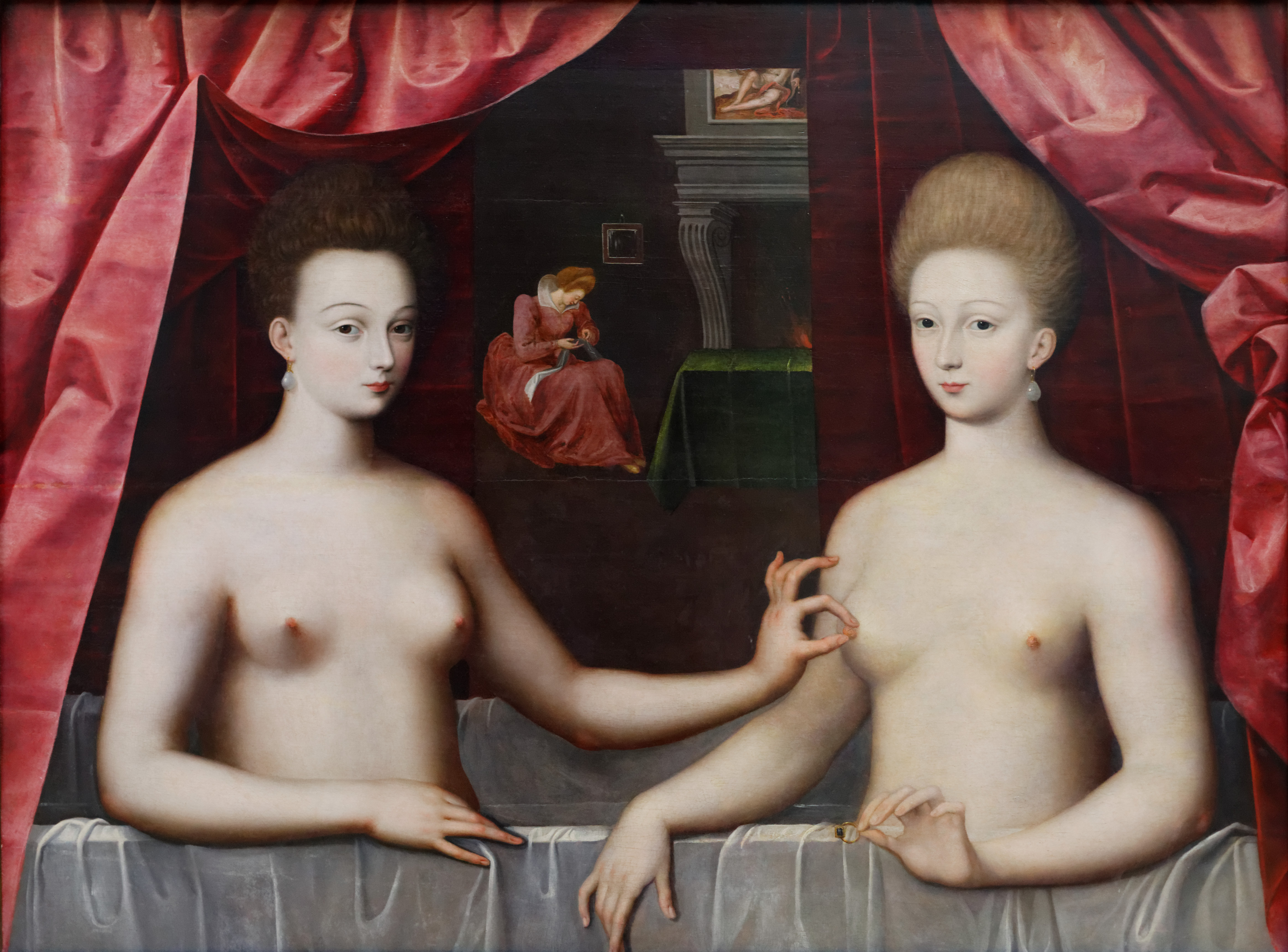
Portrait of Gabrielle d'Estrées and Duchess of Villars, School of Fontainebleau, c.1594

From 1584 to 1594, during the Wars of Religion the château of Fontainebleau was abandoned. Upon his accession to the throne, Henri IV undertook a renovation of the Fontainebleau buildings using a group of artists: the Flemish born Ambroise Dubois (from Antwerp) and the Parisians Toussaint Dubreuil and Martin Fréminet. They are sometimes referred to as the "second school of Fontainebleau". Their late mannerist works, many of which have been lost, continue in the use of elongated and undulating forms and crowded compositions. Many of their subjects include mythological scenes and scenes from works of fiction by the Italian Torquato Tasso and the ancient Greek novelist Heliodorus of Emesa.

Their style continued to have an influence on artists through the first decades of the 17th century, but other artistic currents (Peter Paul Rubens, Caravaggio, the Dutch and Flemish naturalist schools) soon eclipsed them.

=== Notable artists of the second school ===
- Ambroise Dubois (c. 1542–1614, Flemish born)
- Toussaint Dubreuil (c. 1561–1602)
- Martin Fréminet (1567–1619)
- Philippe Millereau

== See also ==
- French art
- French Renaissance
