= Ambroise Dubois =

French painter

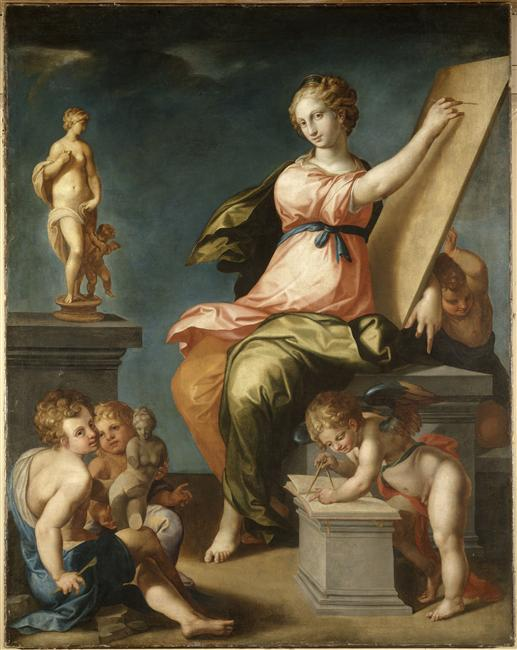
An Allegory of Painting and Sculpture

Ambroise Dubois (French pronunciation: [ɑ̃bʁwaz dybwa]), originally Ambrosius Bosschaert (c.1543 – 1614/15) was a French painter, associated with the Second School of Fontainebleau.

== Biography ==
Dubois was born in Antwerp. There is some uncertainty about when he arrived in Paris. The art historian, André Félibien, wrote that it was probably around 1568. Other sources give the year as 1585. The first written evidence of his presence there is a document from 1595, referring to him as a "painter to the King".

By 1601, he was serving as Valet de Chambre for King Henry IV. That same year, he married Françoise de Hoey, daughter of the painter Jean de Hoey, a fellow Dutchman. In 1602, he succeeded Toussaint Dubreuil (deceased) as court painter.

His most extensive work dates from this period. Performed for Queen Marie de Medici, it involved decorating the Queen's Gallery with scenes from the stories of Diana and Apollo. They were destroyed during the First Empire, but some sketches and preliminary paintings survived and were reassembled during the reign of King Louis Philippe I. Other works in the same building remained in their original forms, such as those depicting the story of "Tancred and Clorinda" from Jerusalem Delivered by Torquato Tasso.

Also of note are several decorations for what is now known as the Hall of Louis XIII. These were scenes from the Aethiopica (also known as Theagenes and Chariclea) by Heliodorus. He also created portraits. The one of Queen Marie is perhaps the best known.

Dubois died in Fontainebleau. His son Jean, known as Jean Dubois the Elder (1604–1679), was also a painter, who held official positions under King Louis XIII.

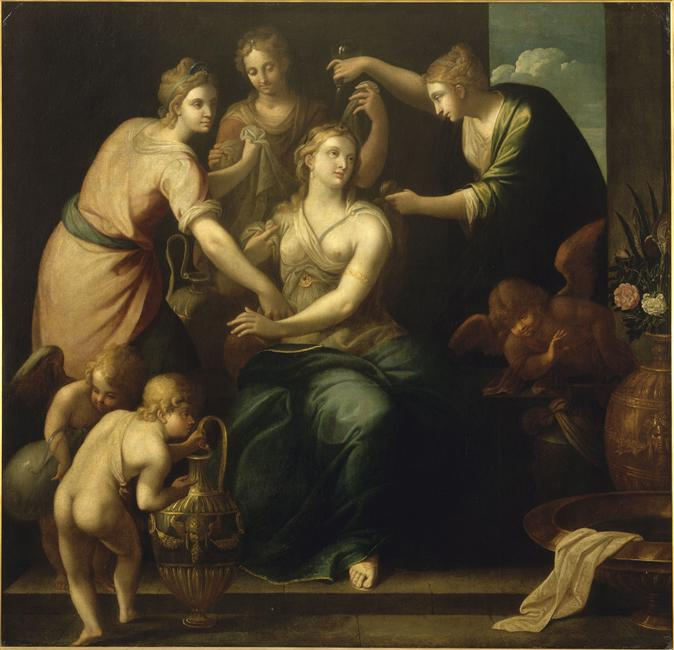
Psyche Being Groomed
