= Francesco Primaticcio =

Italian painter (1504–1570)

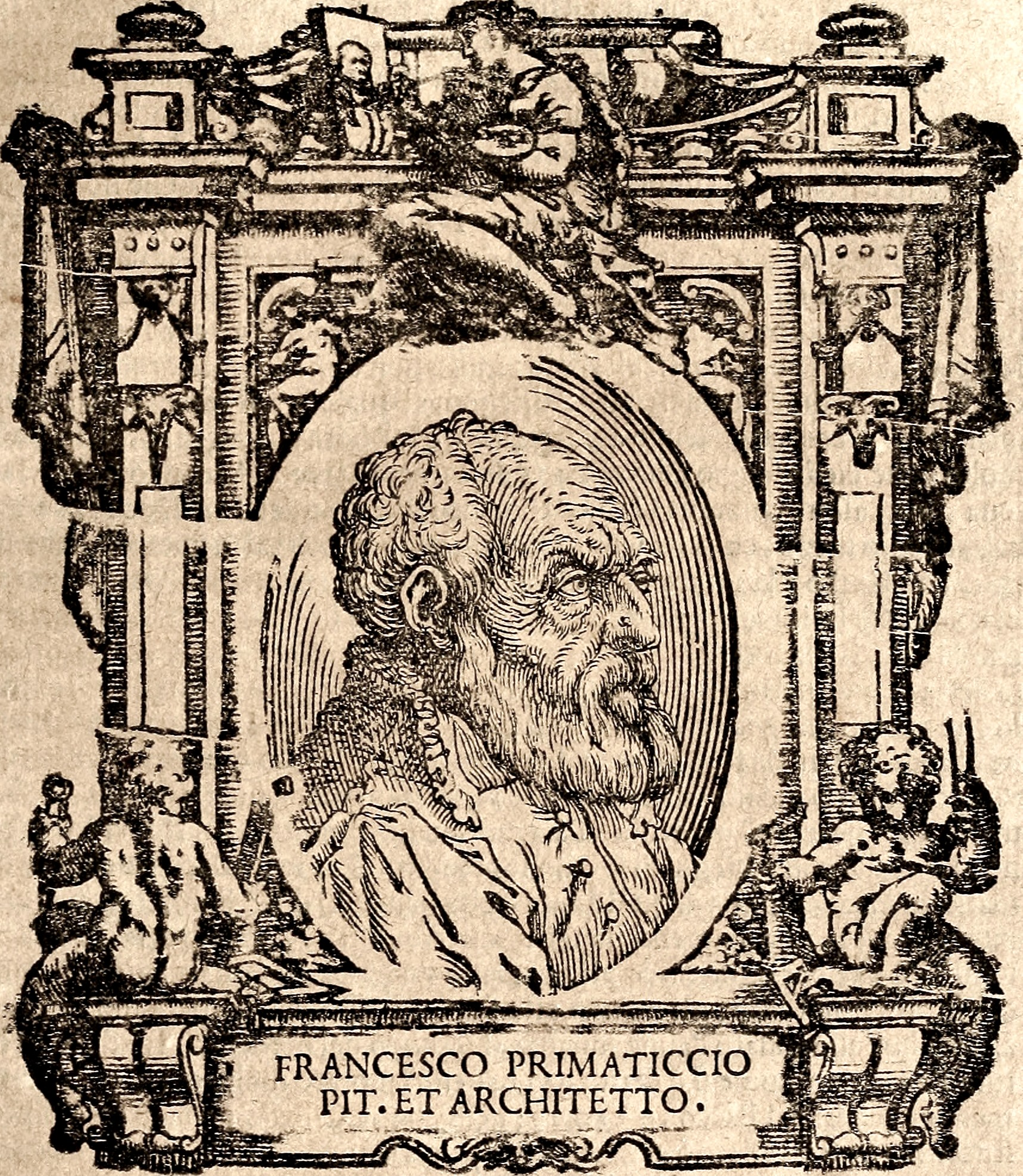
1648 woodcut portrait of Francesco Primaticcio

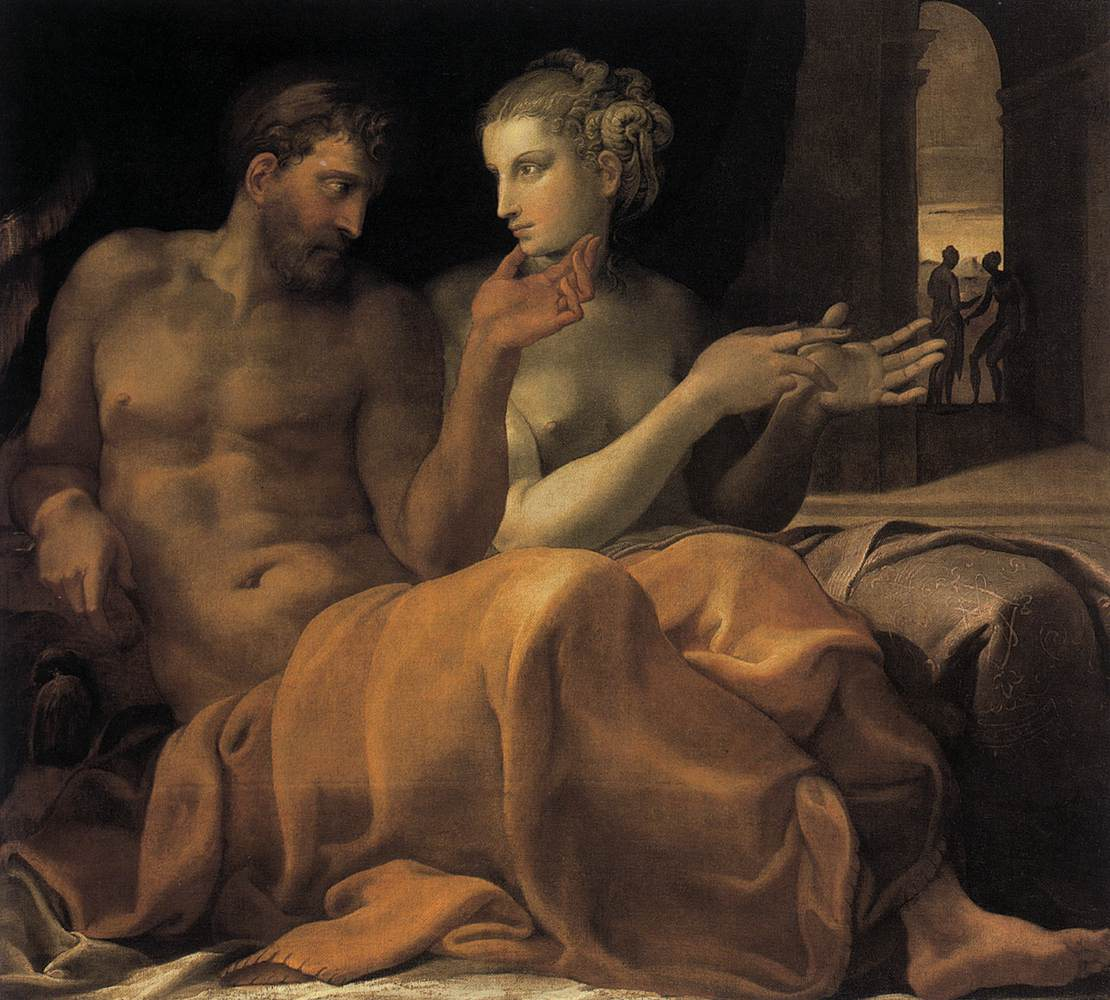
Odysseus and Penelope, 1563

Francesco Primaticcio (Italian pronunciation: [franˈtʃesko primaˈtittʃo]; April 30, 1504 – 1570) was an Italian Mannerist painter, architect and sculptor who spent most of his career in France.

== Biography ==
Born in Bologna, he trained under Giulio Romano in Mantua and became a pupil of Innocenzo da Imola, executing decorations at the Palazzo Te before securing a position in the court of Francis I of France in 1532.

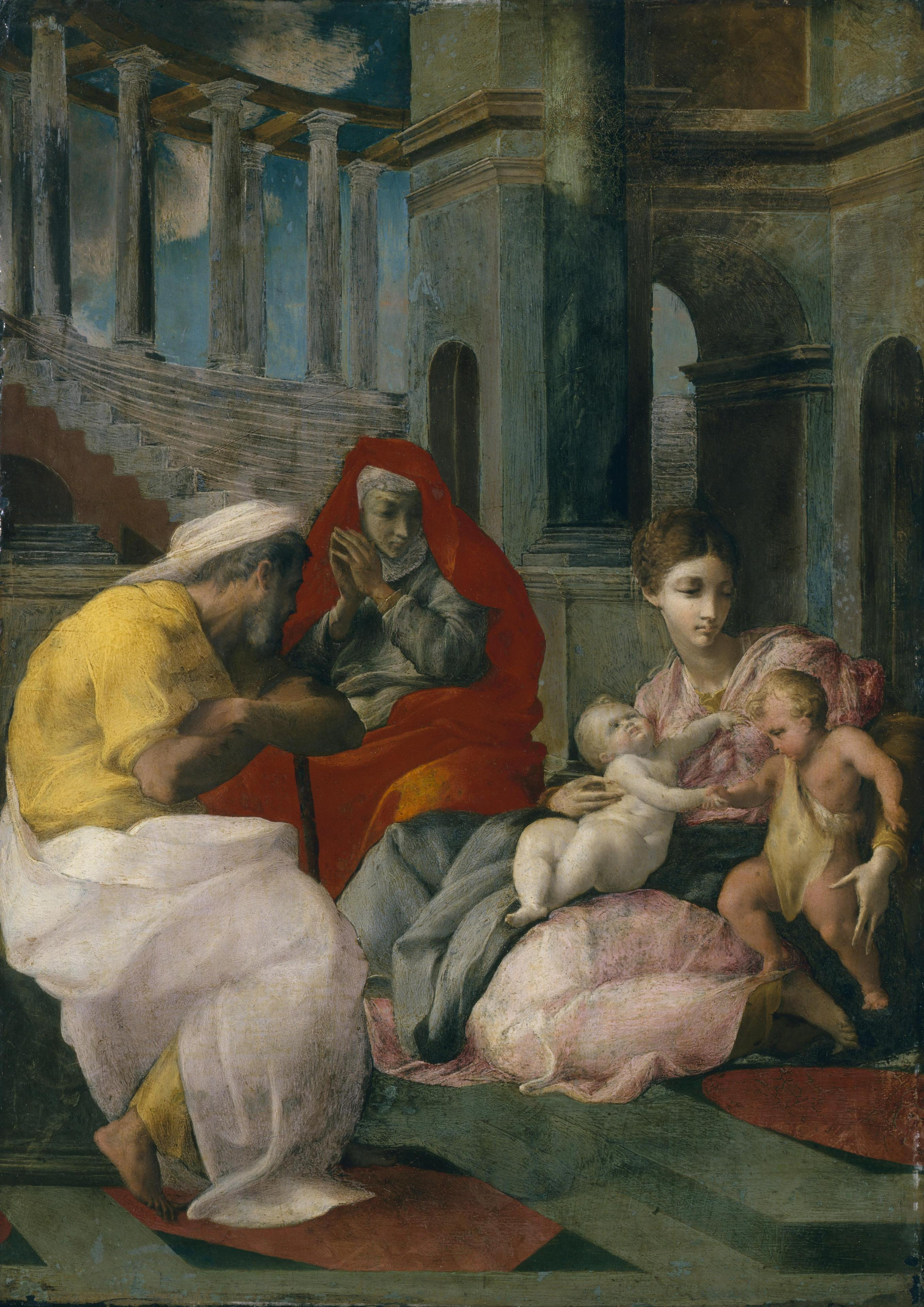
Holy Family with St Elizabeth and John the Baptist, now in the Hermitage Museum, St Petersburg, Russia.

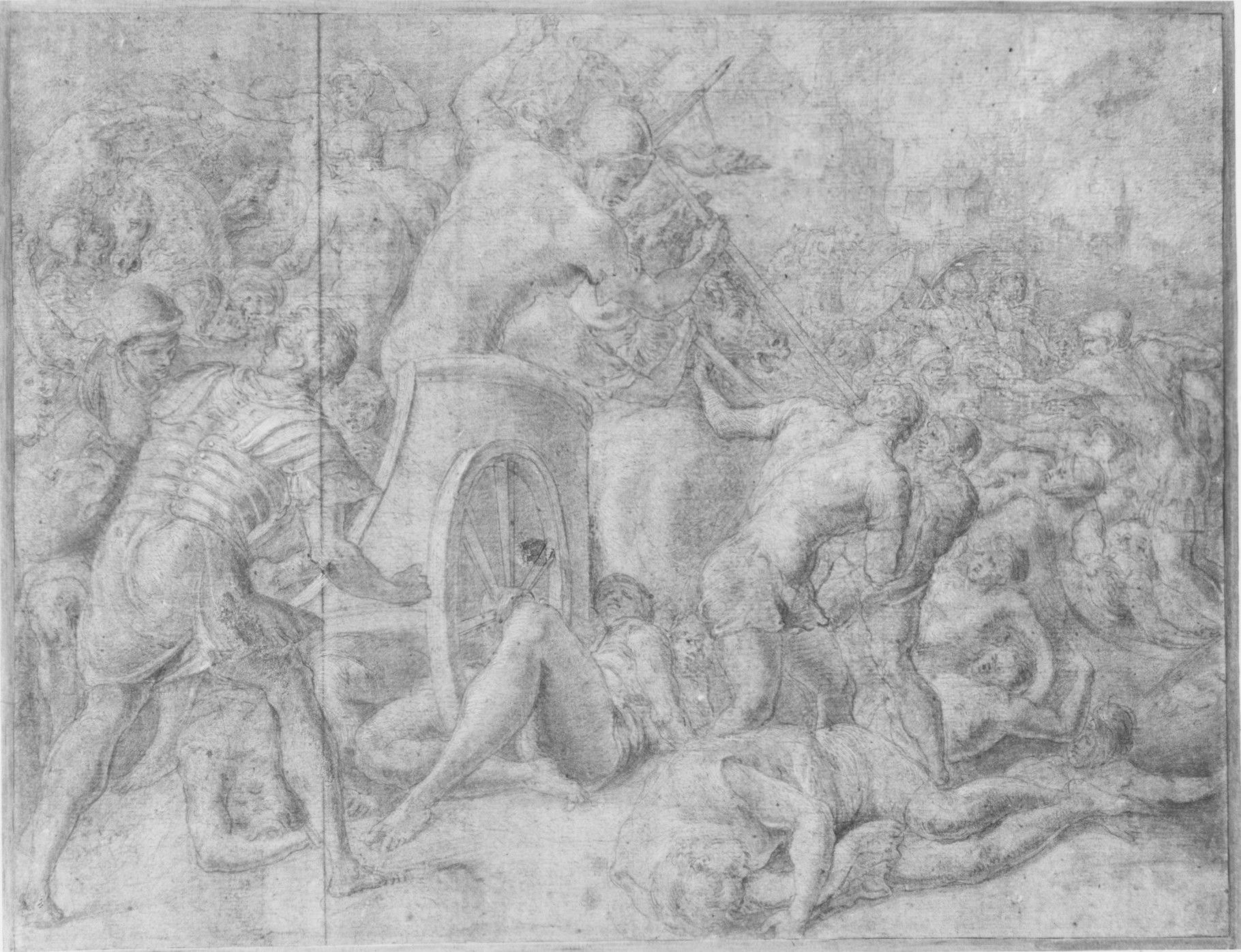
Ulysses and His Companions Fighting the Cicones Before the City of Ismaros, Study for a destroyed fresco in the Galerie d'Ulysee, Chateau de Fontainebleau

Together with Rosso Fiorentino he was one of the leading artists to work at the Chateau Fontainebleau (where he is grouped with the so-called "First School of Fontainebleau") spending much of his life there. Following Rosso's death in 1540, Primaticcio took control of the artistic direction at Fontainebleau, furnishing the painters and stuccators of his team, such as Nicolò dell'Abate, with designs. He made cartoons for tapestry-weavers and, like all 16th-century court artists, was called upon to design elaborate ephemeral decorations for masques and fêtes, which survive only in preparatory drawings and, sometimes, engravings. Francis I trusted his eye and sent him back to Italy on buying trips in 1540 and again in 1545.

In Rome, part of Primaticcio's commission was to take casts of the best Roman sculptures in the papal collections, some of which were cast in bronze to decorate the parterres at Fontainebleau.

Primaticcio retained his position as court painter to Francis' heirs, Henry II and Francis II. His masterpiece, the Salle d'Hercule at Fontainebleau, occupied him and his team from the 1530s to 1559.

Primaticcio's crowded Mannerist compositions and his long-legged canon of beauty influenced French art for the rest of the century.

Primaticcio turned to architecture towards the end of his life, his greatest work being the Valois Chapel at the Abbey of Saint-Denis, although this was not completed until after his death and was destroyed in 1719.

== Gallery ==
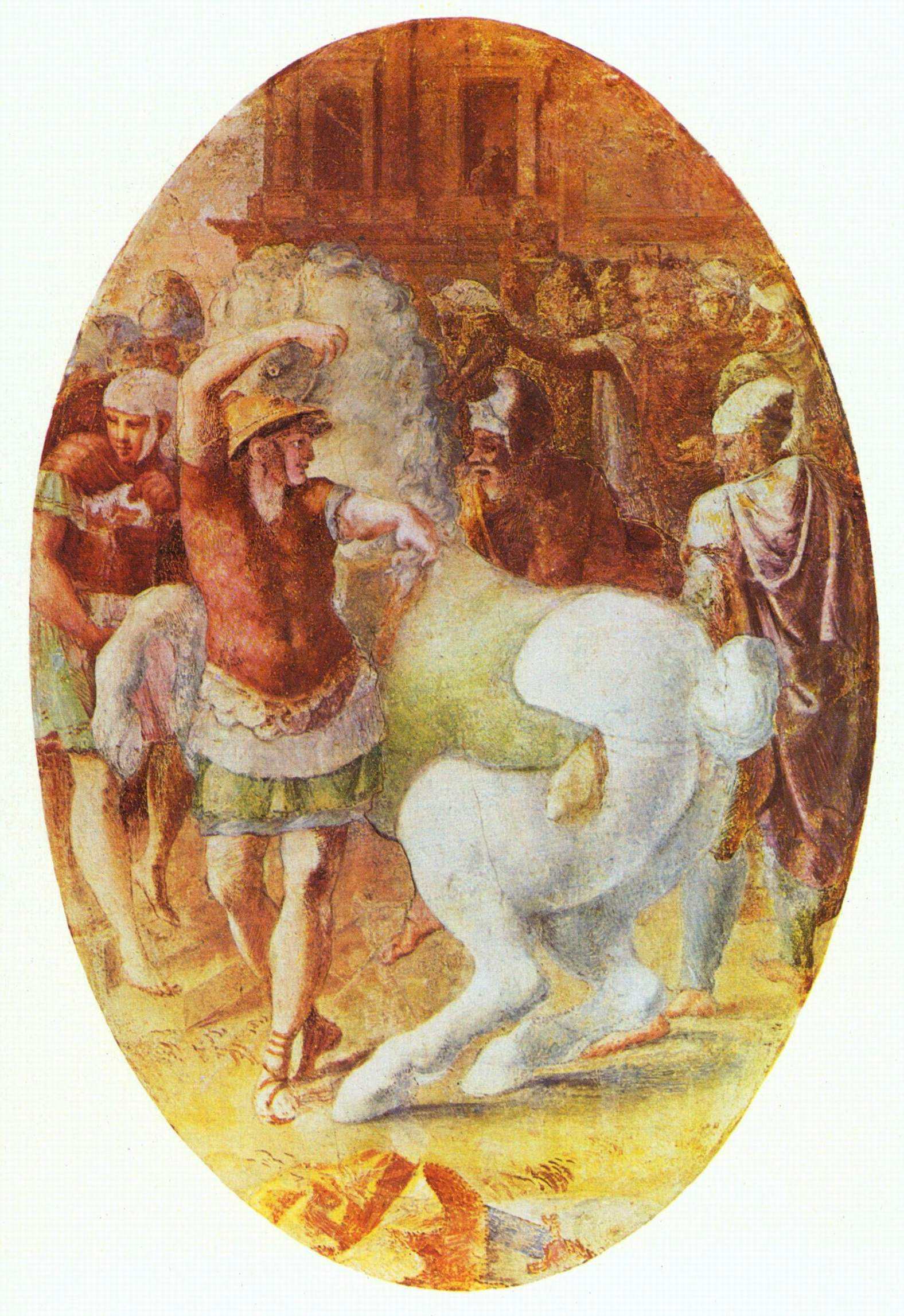
Alexander tames Bucephalus

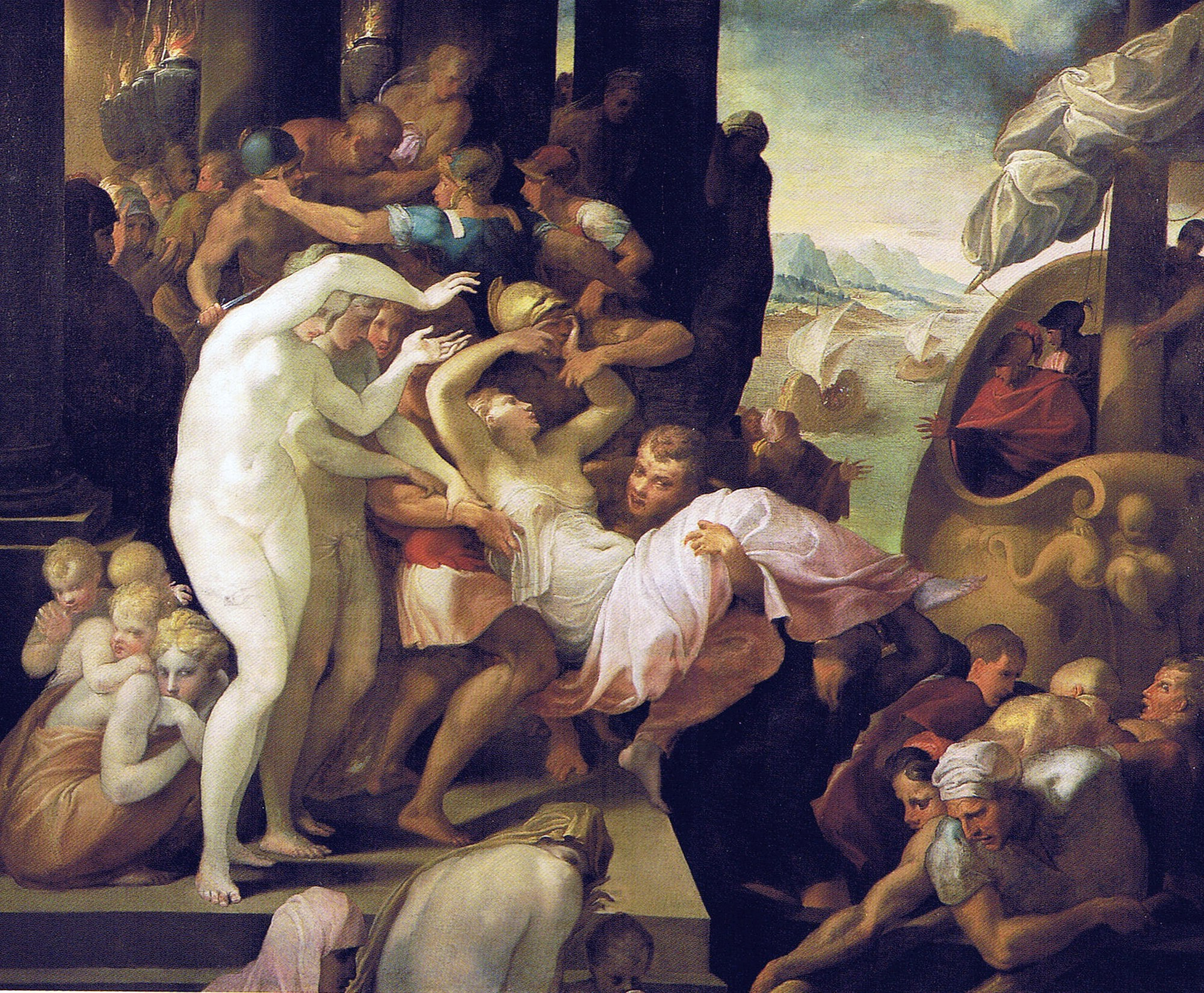
The rape of Helena, 1530-1539

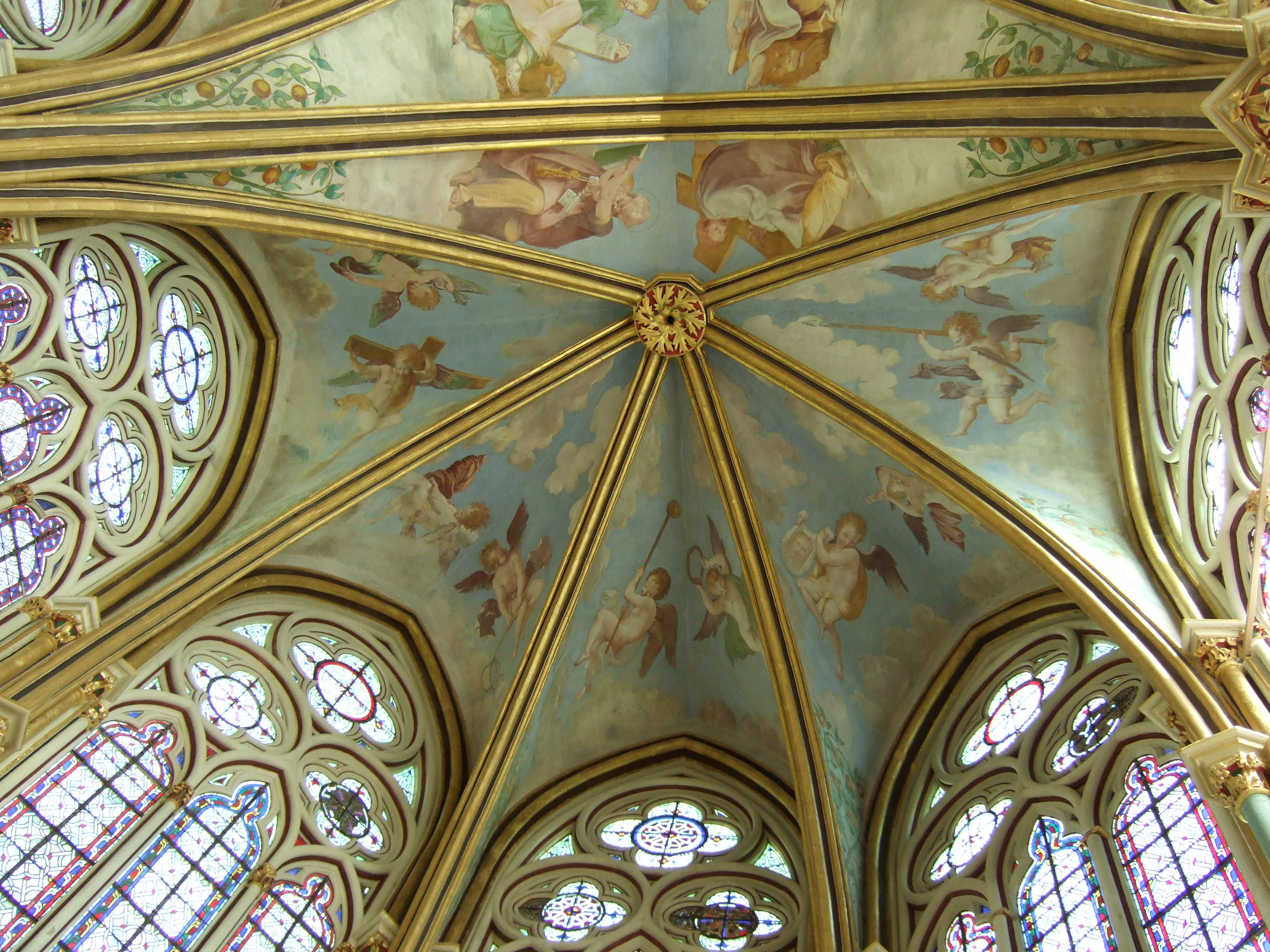
Ceiling at Chaalis Abbey

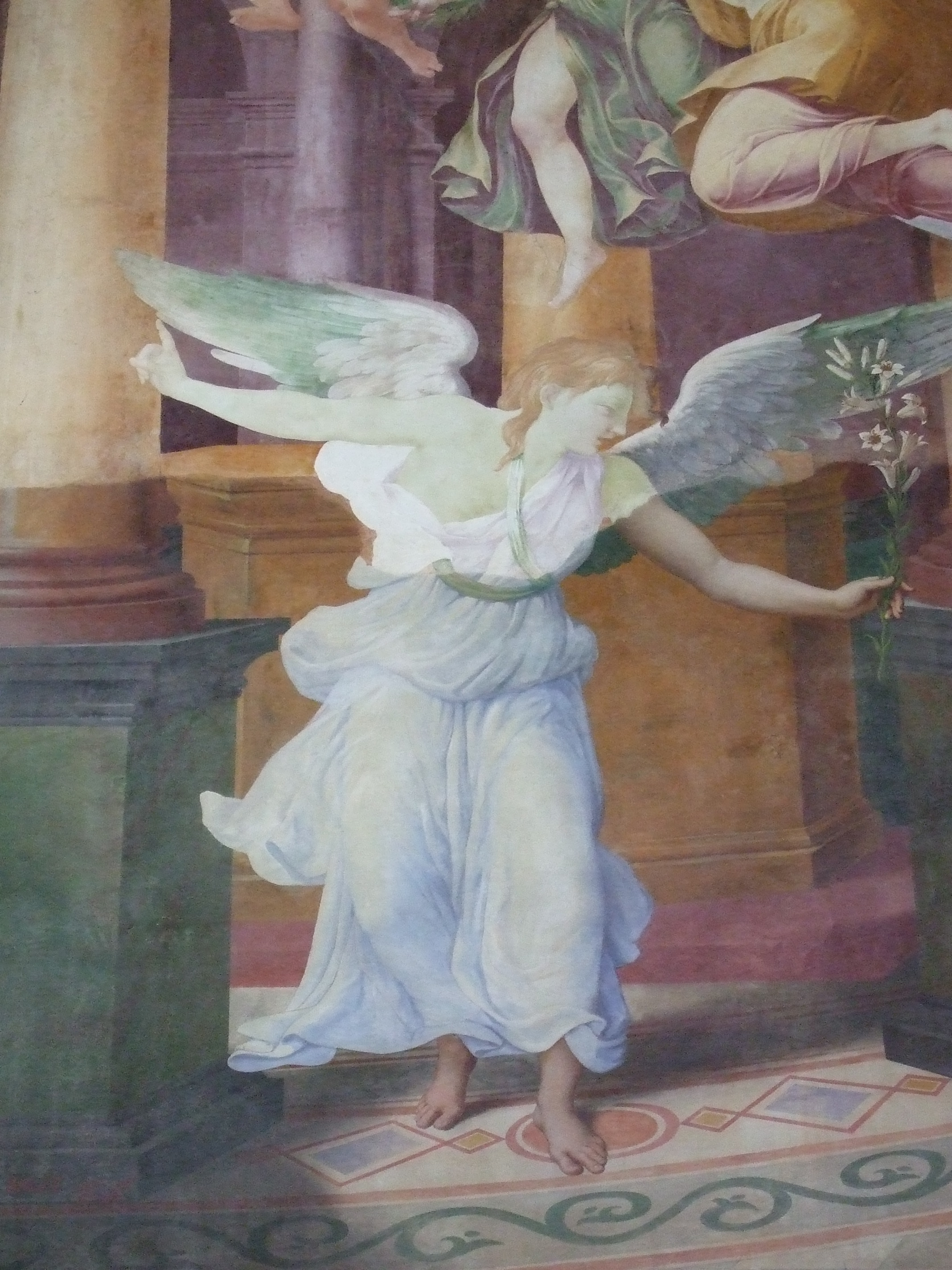
Annunciation at Chaalis

=== Ulysses Gallery at Fontainebleau ===
Engravings by Giorgio Ghisi after Francesco Primaticcio's designs for the ceiling of the Ulysses Gallery (destroyed 1738–39) at Fontainebleau

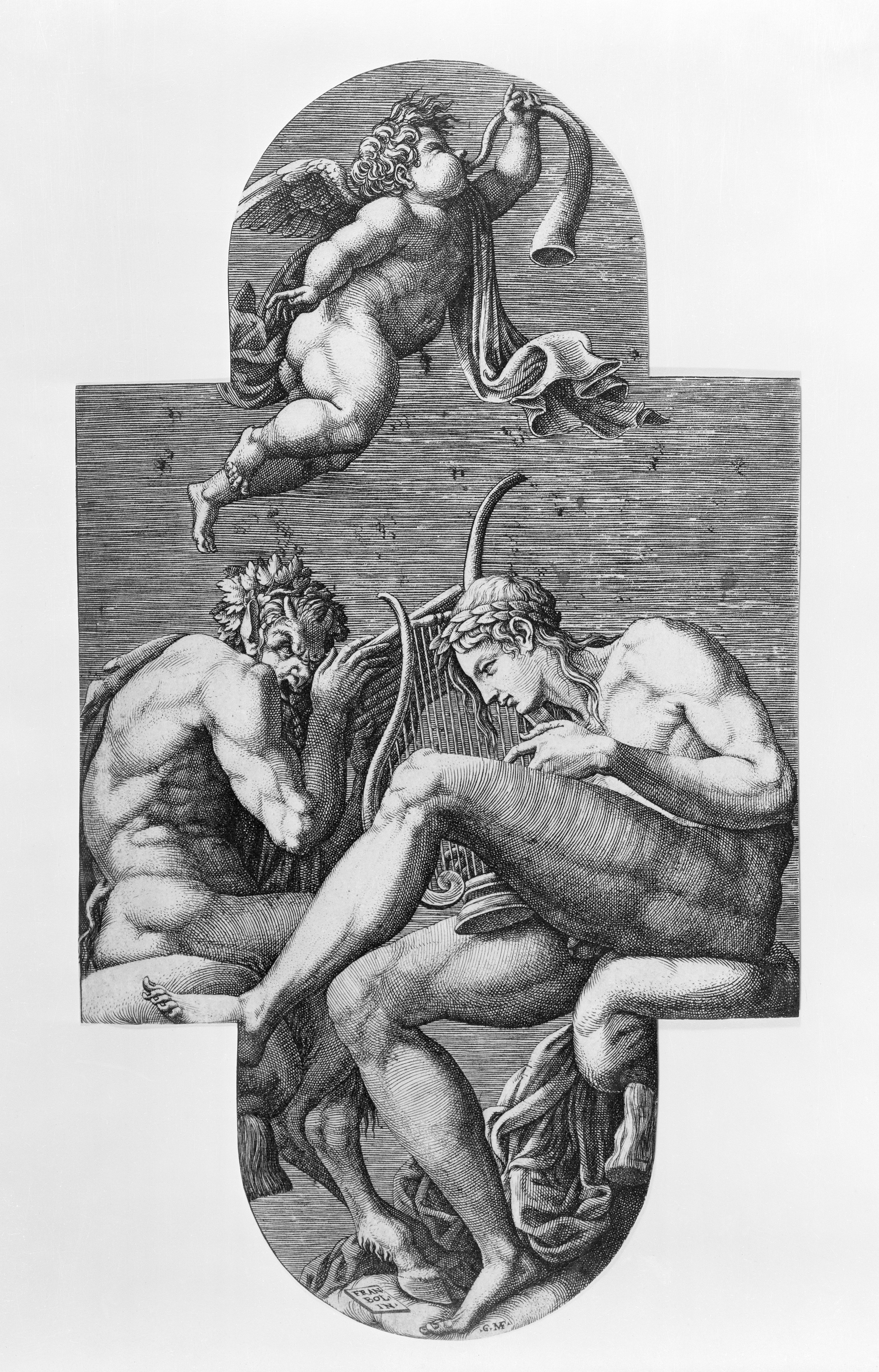
Apollo, Pan, and a putto blowing a horn

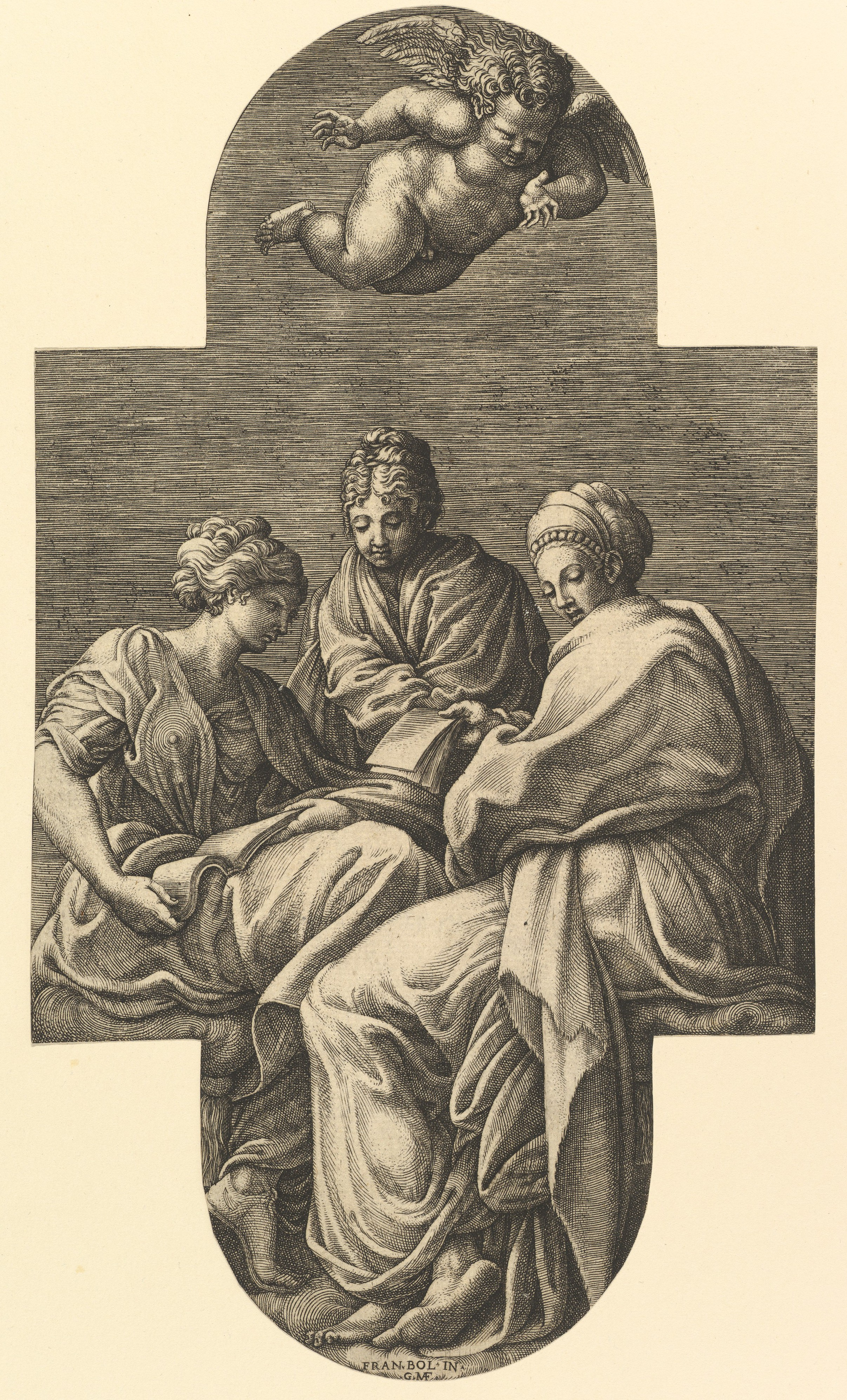
Three Muses and a Gesturing Putto

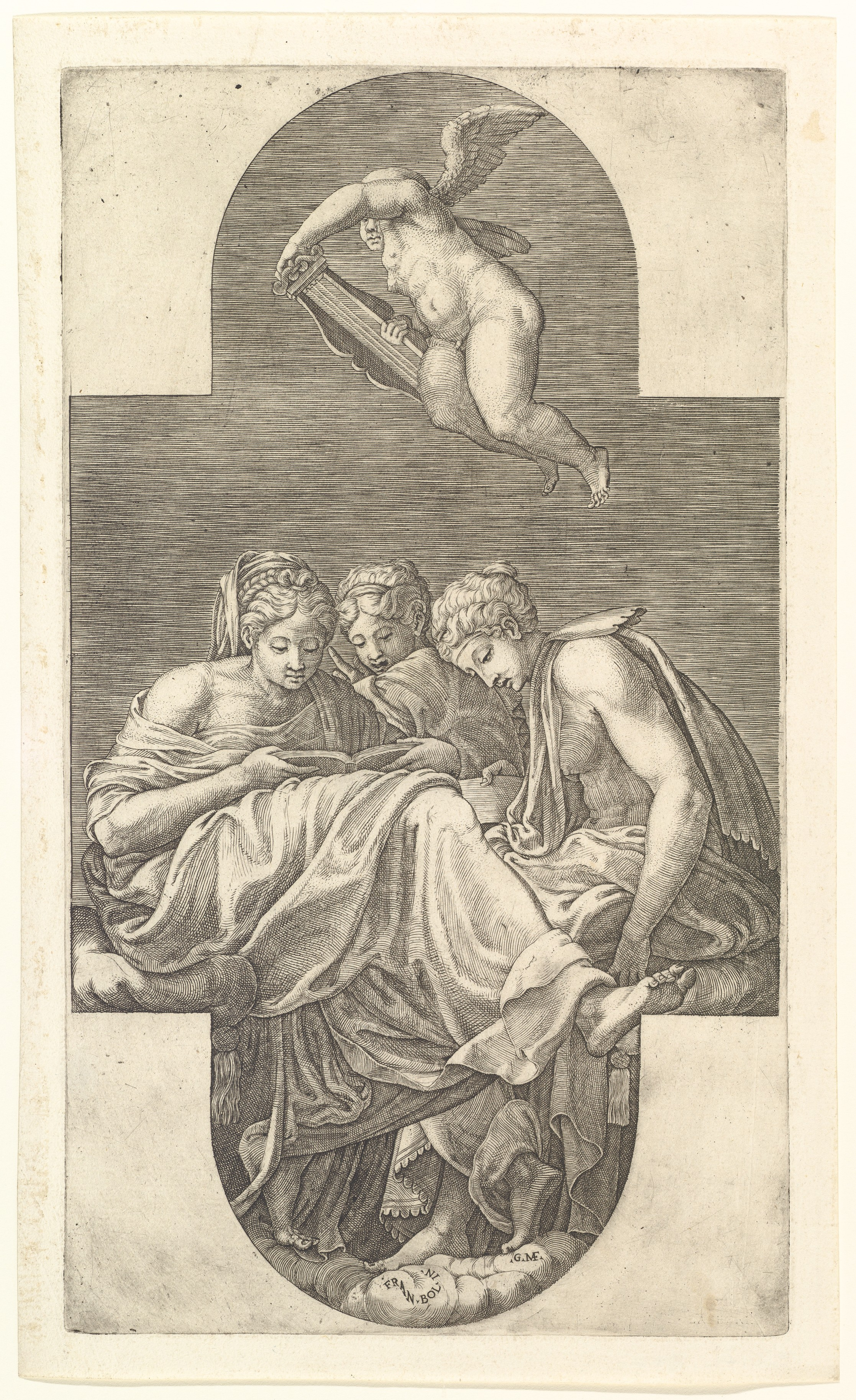
Three Muses and a Putto with a Lyre, a cruciform composition

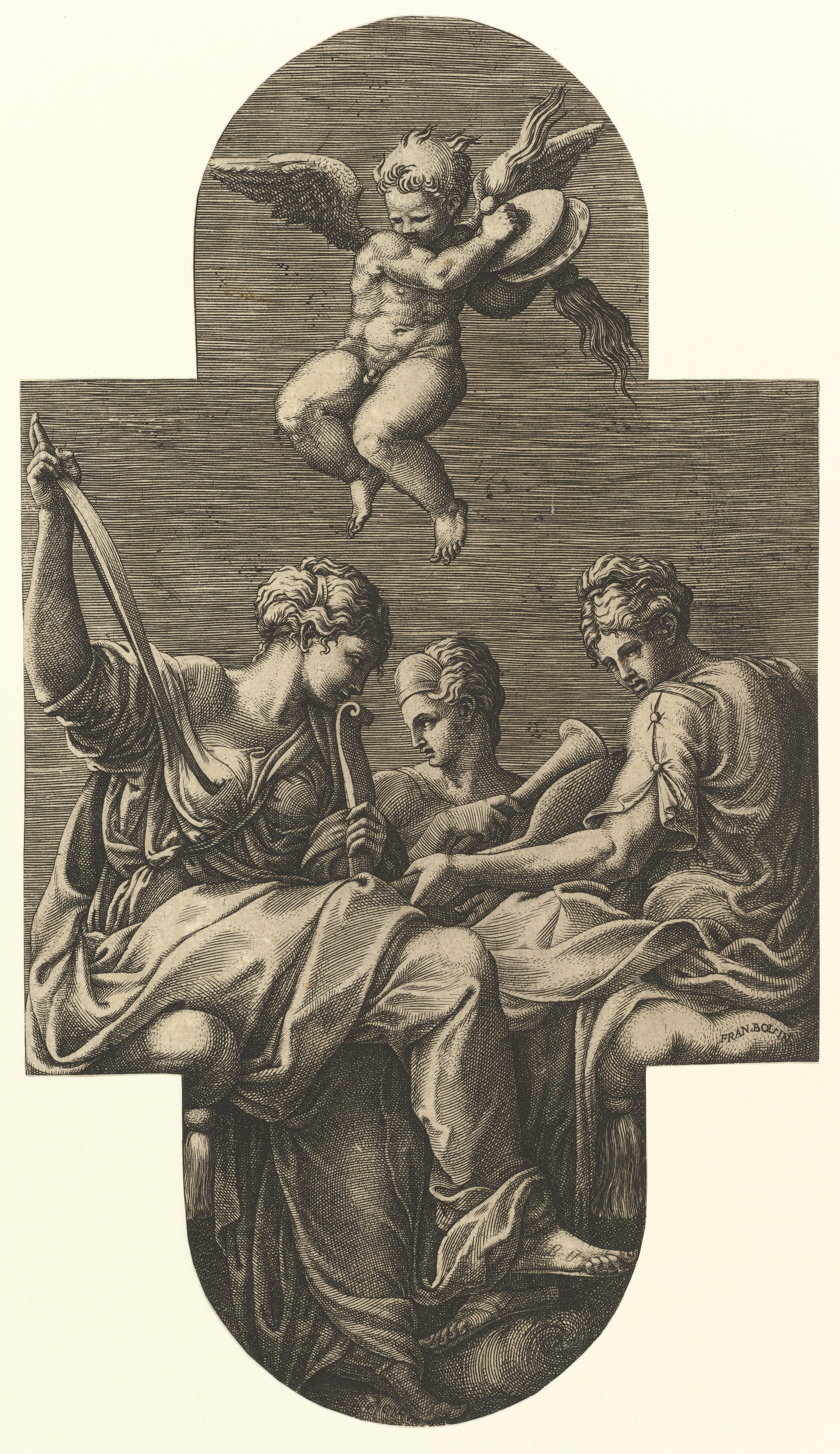
Three Muses and a Putto with Cymbals
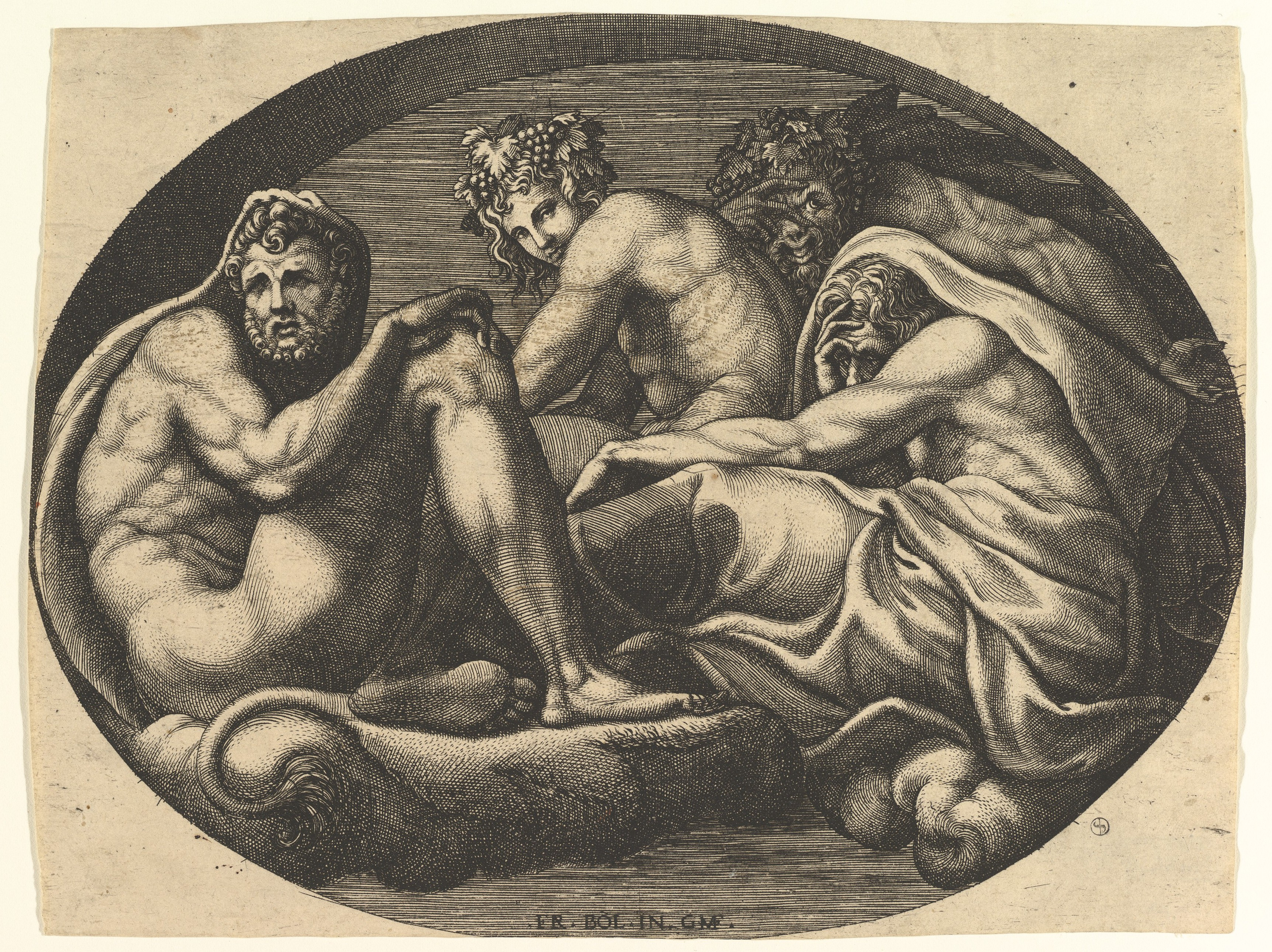
Hercules, Bacchus, Pan, and Saturn(?)

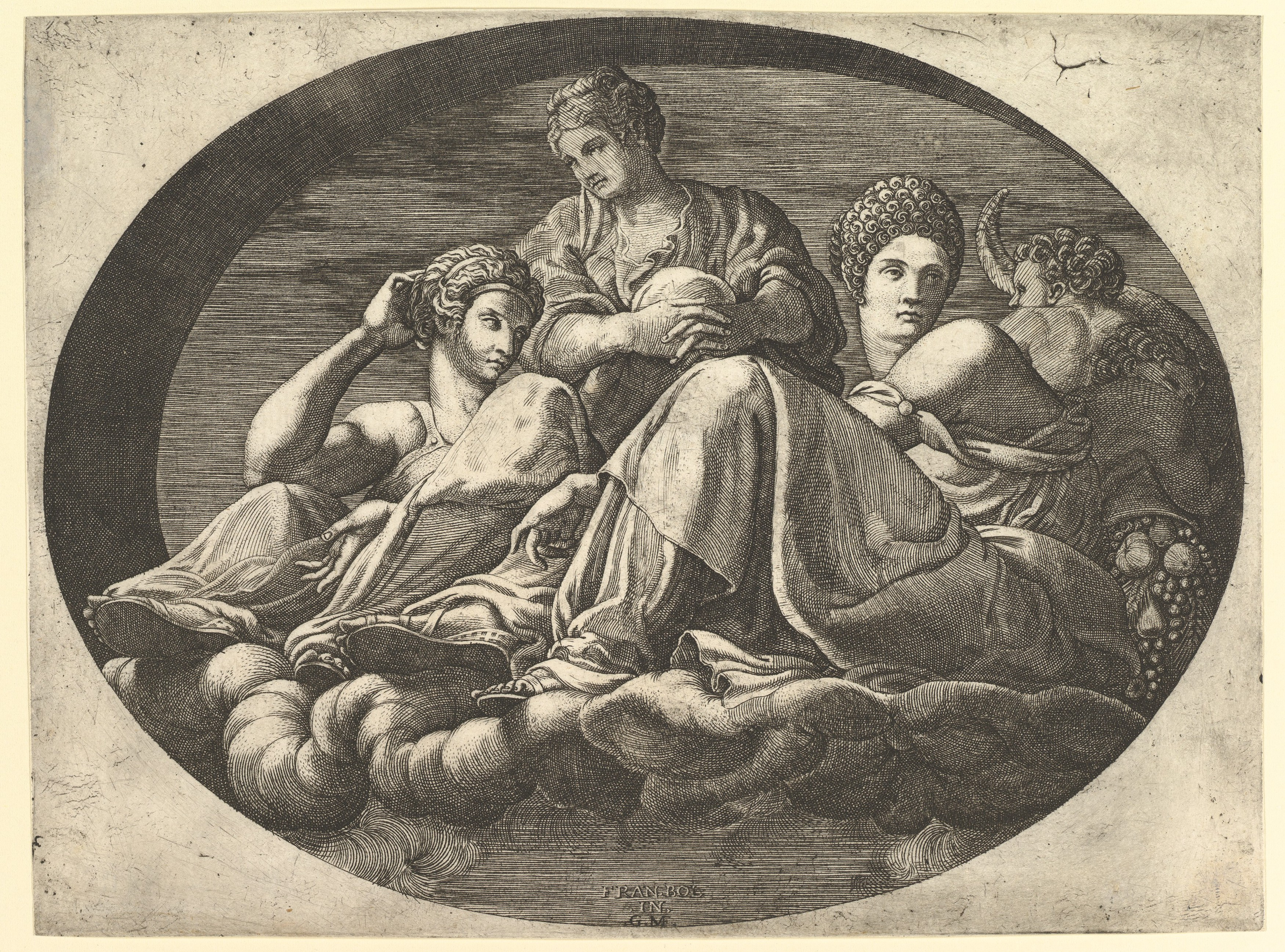
Ceres Seated on Clouds with Two Goddesses and Two Putti

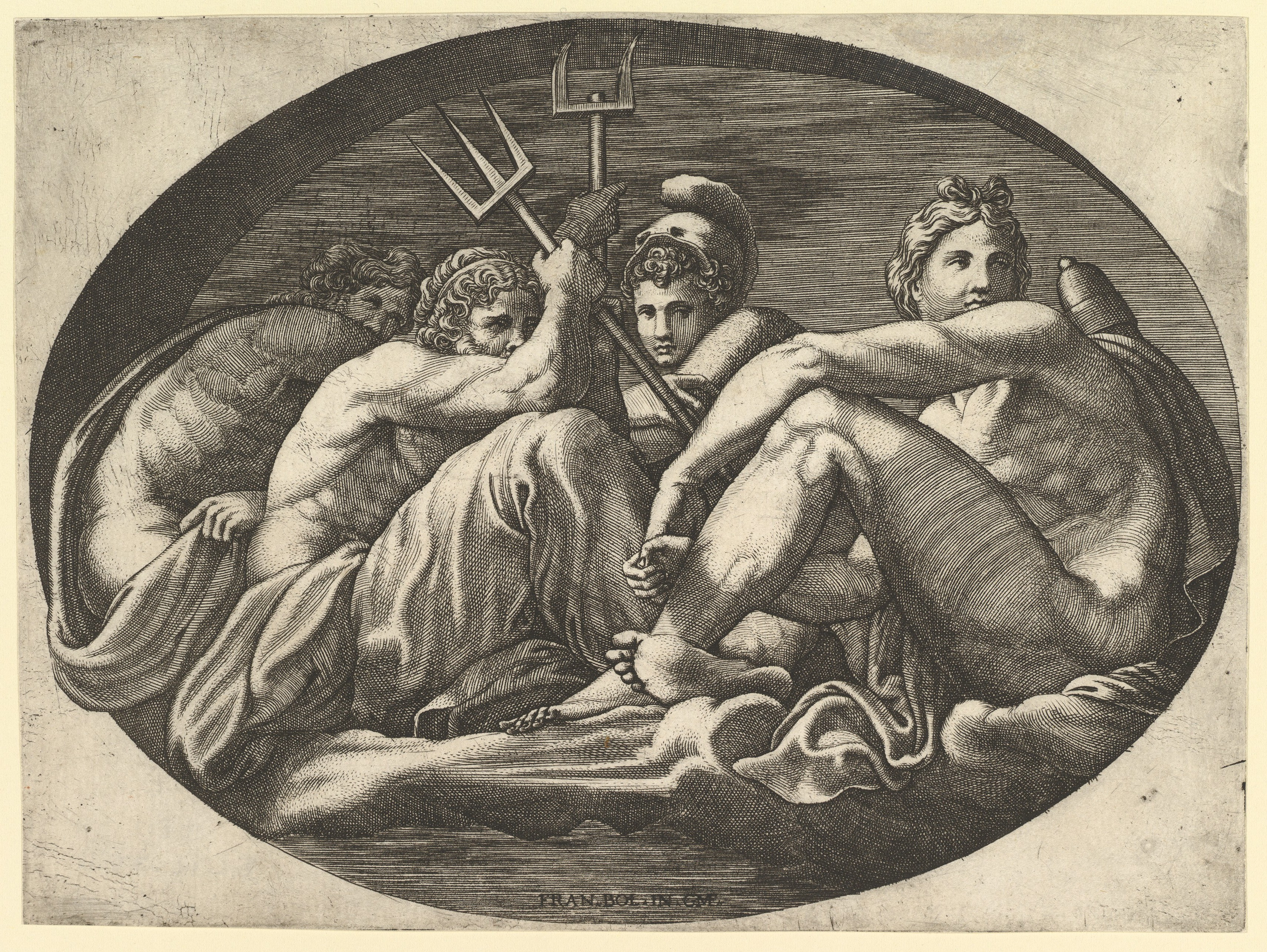
Pluto, Neptune, Minerva and Apollo

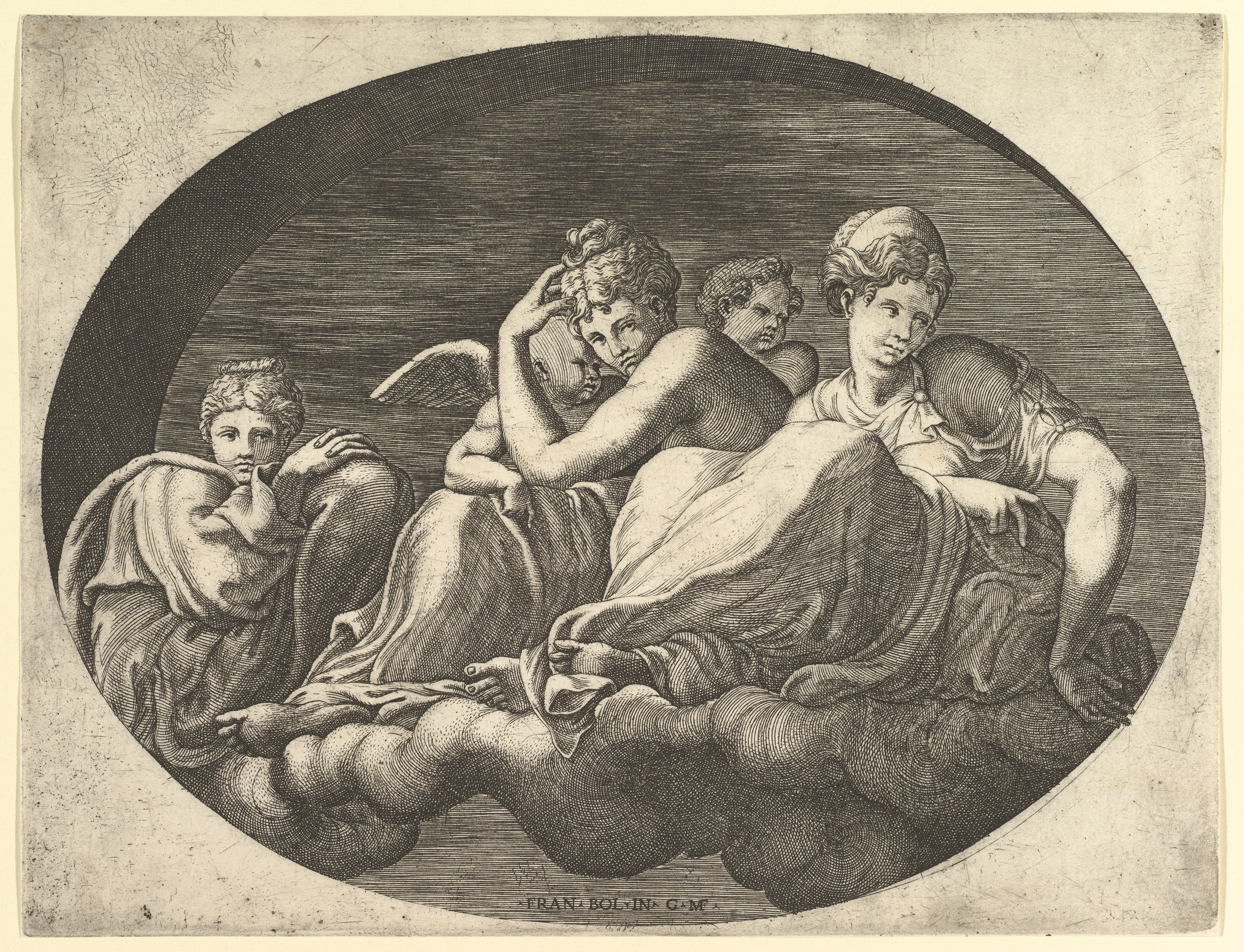
Venus and Cupid, Two Other Goddesses, and a Putto
