= Henry II style =

Artistic movement in the sixteenth century France

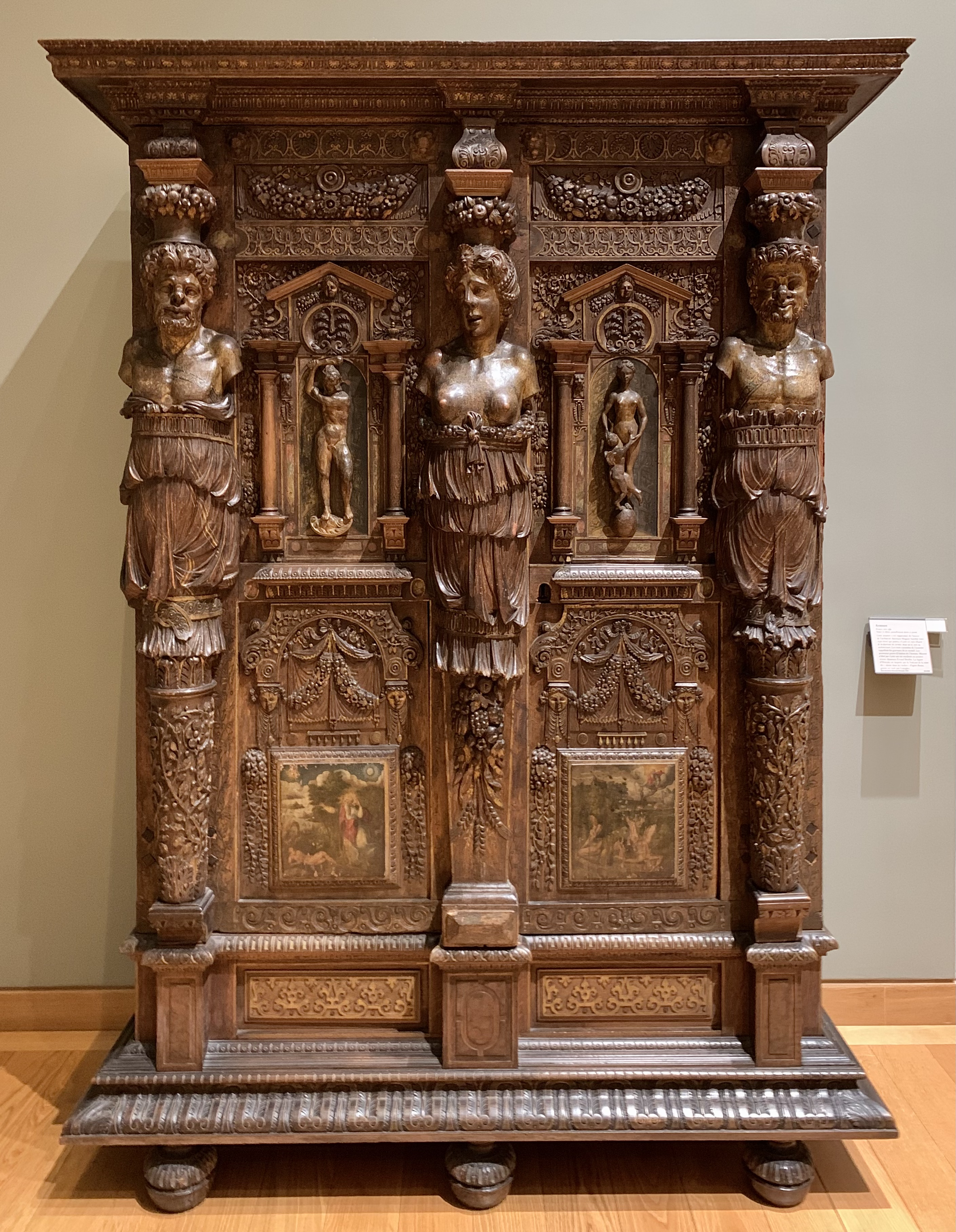
Henry II wardrobe, circa 1580, walnut and oak wood, in the Louvre. Much like Henri II buffets, French Renaissance wardrobes feature the rich sculptural ornamentation (niches, pediments, pilasters, caryatids, festoane) characteristic of much Renaissance furniture

The Henry II style was the chief artistic movement of the sixteenth century in France, part of Northern Mannerism. It came immediately after the High Renaissance and was largely the product of Italian influences. Francis I and his daughter-in-law, Catherine de' Medici, had imported to France a number of Italian artists from Raphael's workshop or former assistants of Michelangelo, known as the School of Fontainebleau, where many were based. Frenchmen were trained in the Mannerist idiom. Besides the work of Italians in France, many Frenchman picked up Italianisms while studying art in Italy during the middle of the century. The Henry II style, though named after Henry II of France, in fact lasted from about 1530 until 1590 under five French monarchs, their queens, and their mistresses.

The most lasting products of the Henry II style were architectural. First Rosso Fiorentino and then Francesco Primaticcio and Sebastiano Serlio served Henry II as court artisans, constructing his gallery and the Aile de la Belle Cheminée (1568) at the Palace of Fontainebleau. The French architect Pierre Lescot and the sculptor Jean Goujon rebuilt the Palais du Louvre around the now famous Cour Carrée. The Château d'Anet, commissioned by Diane de Poitiers, mistress of Henry II, was designed by Philibert Delorme, who studied in Rome. The very Mannerist château housed a statue of Diana by Benvenuto Cellini, who was working in France. In 1564 Delorme began work on the Tuileries, the most outstanding Parisian palais of the Henry II style. It too exhibited a Mannerist treatment of classical themes, for which Delorme had developed his own "French order" of columns.

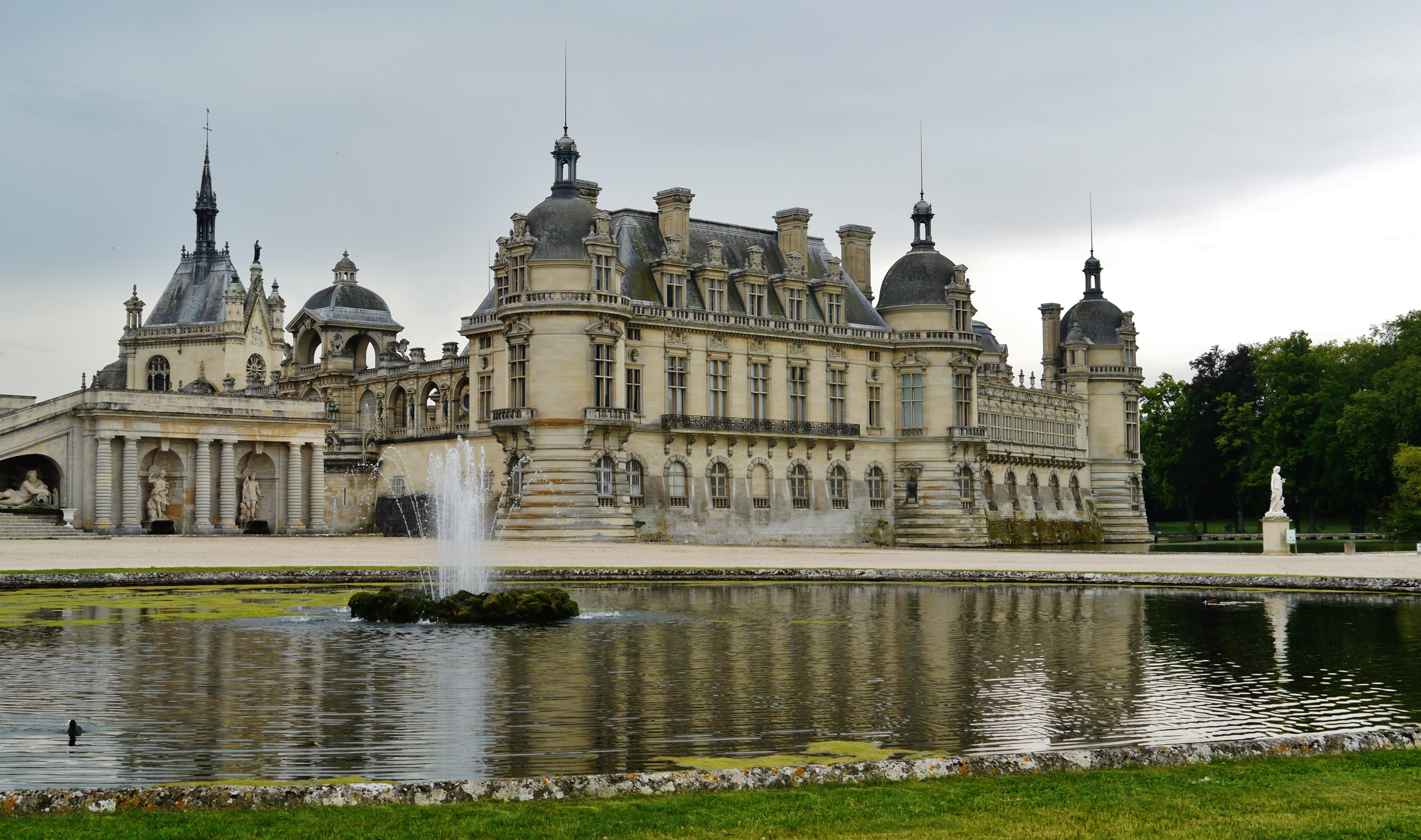
The Chateau de Chantilly

Jean Bullant, another architect who studied in Rome, also produced designs that combined classical "themes" in a Mannerist structure. The Château d'Écouen and the Château de Chantilly, both for Anne de Montmorency, exemplify the Henry II-style château, which was proliferating among the nobility. A very thorough catalogue of engravings of sixteenth-century French architecture was produced by Jacques Androuet du Cerceau the Elder under the title Les plus excellents bâtiments de France (between 1576 and 1579, in two volumes). Much of the buildings so engraved have been destroyed (like the Tuileries) or significantly altered (like Écouen), so that Cerceau's reproductions are the best guide to the Henry II style.

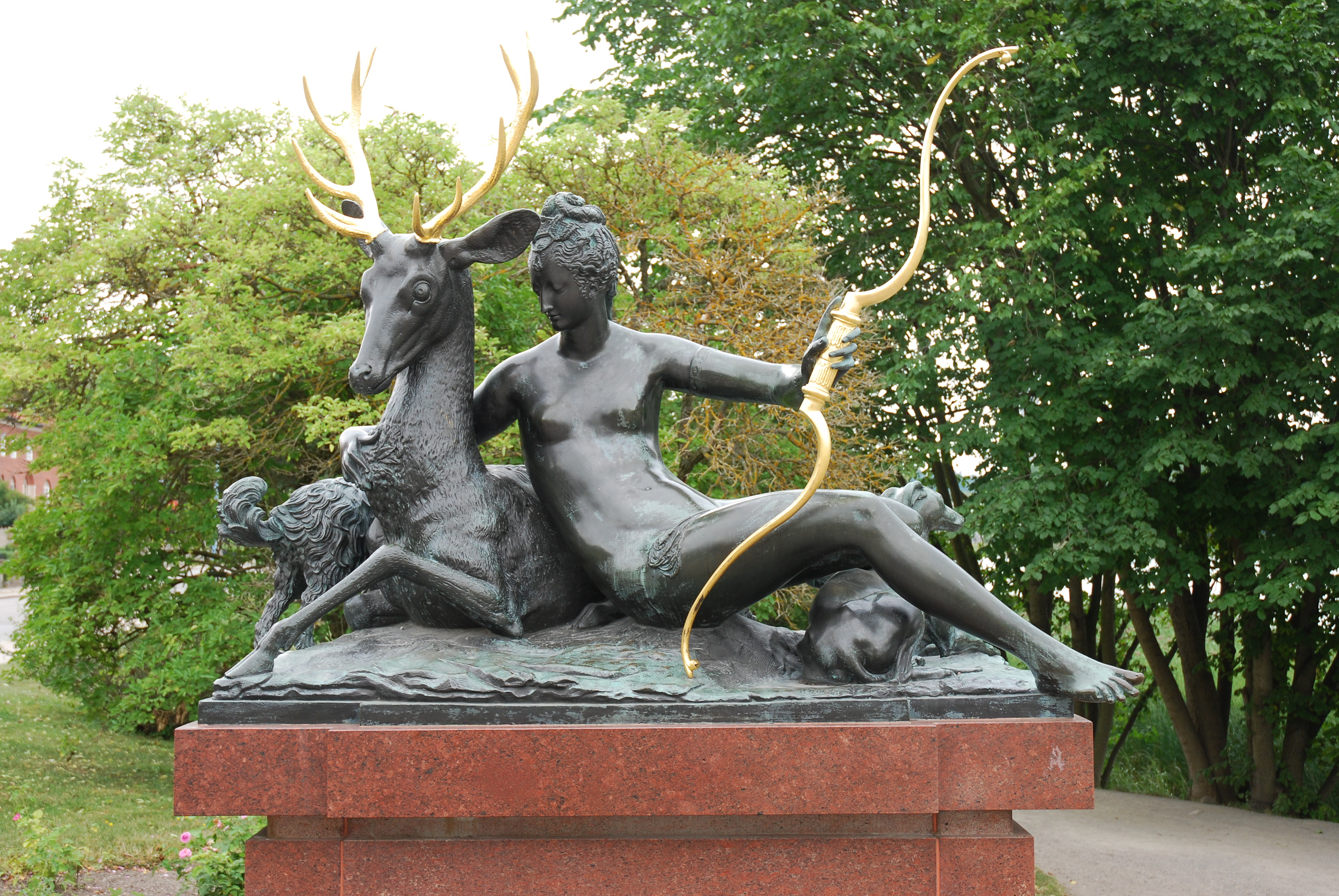
Diane appuyée sur un cerf by Goujon

In painting, like in architecture, the French were influenced by Italian Mannerism and many Italian painters and sculptors were active members of the First School of Fontainebleau, which in turn produced an active and talented crop of native painters and sculptors, such as Germain Pilon and Juste de Juste. By the end of the century the Henry II style, a Gallicised form of Italian Mannerism, had been replaced by a more consistent classicism, with hints of the coming Baroque.

Its immediately successor in French art historiography is the Henry IV style, sometimes called the Second School of Fontainebleau.
