= Henry IV of France =

King of France from 1589 to 1610

Henry IV
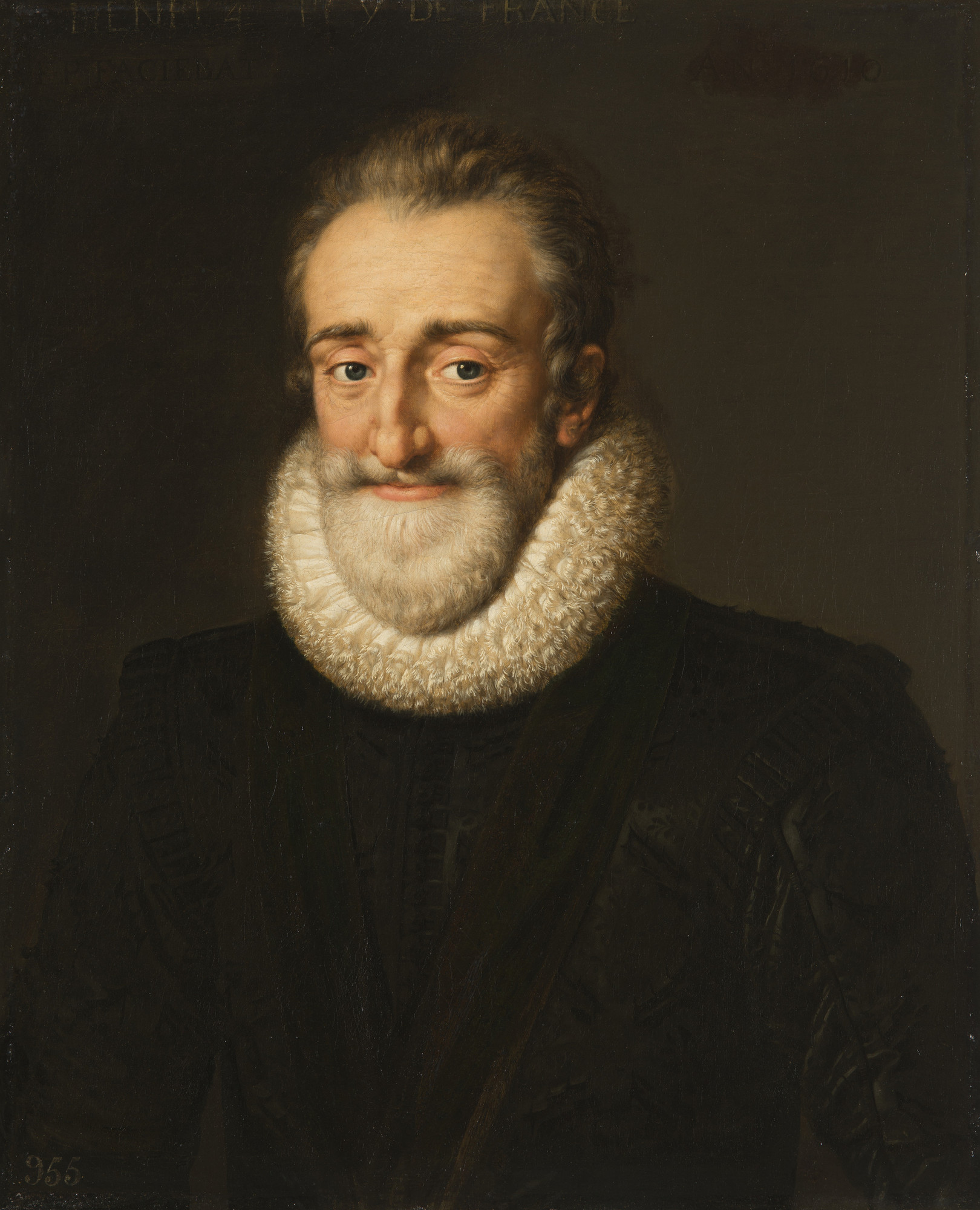
- Portrait by Frans Pourbus, 1610

King of France
- Reign: 2 August 1589 – 14 May 1610
- Coronation: 27 February 1594; Chartres Cathedral
- Predecessor: Henry III
- Successor: Louis XIII
- Rival king: Charles (X) (1589–1590)

King of Navarre
- Reign: 9 June 1572 – 14 May 1610
- Predecessor: Jeanne III
- Successor: Louis II
- Born: 13 December 1553; Château de Pau, Principality of Béarn
- Died: 14 May 1610 (aged 56); Palais du Louvre, Paris, Kingdom of France
- Cause of death: Assassination
- Burial: 1 July 1610; Basilica of Saint-Denis
- Spouses: Margaret of Valois (m. 1572; ann. 1599) Marie de' Medici (m. 1600)
- Issue: Louis XIII, King of France; Elisabeth, Queen of Spain and Portugal; Christine, Duchess of Savoy; Nicolas, Duke of Orléans; Gaston, Duke of Orléans; Henrietta Maria, Queen of England, Scotland, and Ireland; Illegitimate: César, Duke of Vendôme; Catherine Henriette, Duchess of Elbeuf; Alexandre, Chevalier de Vendôme; Gabrielle Angélique de Bourbon, Mademoiselle de Verneuil; Gaston Henri de Bourbon
- House: Bourbon
- Father: Antoine of Bourbon
- Mother: Jeanne III of Navarre
- Religion: Calvinism (1553–1593); Catholicism (1593–1610)

Henry IV (French: Henri IV; 13 December 1553 – 14 May 1610), also known by the epithets Good King Henry (le Bon Roi Henri) or Henry the Great (Henri le Grand), was King of Navarre (as Henry III) from 1572 and King of France from 1589 to 1610. He was the first monarch of France from the House of Bourbon, a cadet branch of the Capetian dynasty. He pragmatically balanced the interests of the Catholic and Protestant parties in France, as well as among the European states. He was assassinated in Paris in 1610 by a Catholic zealot, and was succeeded by his son Louis XIII.

Henry was baptised a Catholic but raised as a Huguenot in the Protestant faith by his mother, Queen Jeanne III of Navarre. He inherited the throne of Navarre in 1572 on his mother's death. As a Huguenot, Henry was involved in the French Wars of Religion, barely escaping assassination in the St. Bartholomew's Day massacre. He later led Protestant forces against the French royal army. Henry inherited the throne of France in 1589 upon the death of Henry III, his distant cousin. Henry IV initially kept the Protestant faith (the only French king to do so) and had to fight against the Catholic League, which refused to accept a Protestant monarch. After four years of military stalemate, Henry converted to Catholicism, reportedly saying that "Paris is well worth a Mass". As a pragmatic politician (politique), he promulgated the Edict of Nantes (1598), which guaranteed religious liberties to Protestants, thereby effectively ending the French Wars of Religion.

An active ruler, Henry worked to regularize state finance, promote agriculture, and encourage education. He began the first successful French colonization of the Americas. He promoted trade and industry, and prioritized the construction of roads, bridges, and canals to facilitate communication within France and strengthen the country's cohesion. These efforts stimulated economic growth and improved living standards.

While the Edict of Nantes brought religious peace to France, some hardline Catholics and Huguenots remained dissatisfied, leading to occasional outbreaks of violence and conspiracies. Henry IV also faced resistance from certain noble factions who opposed his centralization policies, leading to political instability. His main foreign policy success was the Peace of Vervins in 1598, which made peace in the long-running conflict with Spain. He formed a strategic alliance with England. He also forged alliances with Protestant states, such as the Dutch Republic and several German states, to counter the Catholic powers. His policies contributed to the stability and prominence of France in European affairs.

== Early life ==
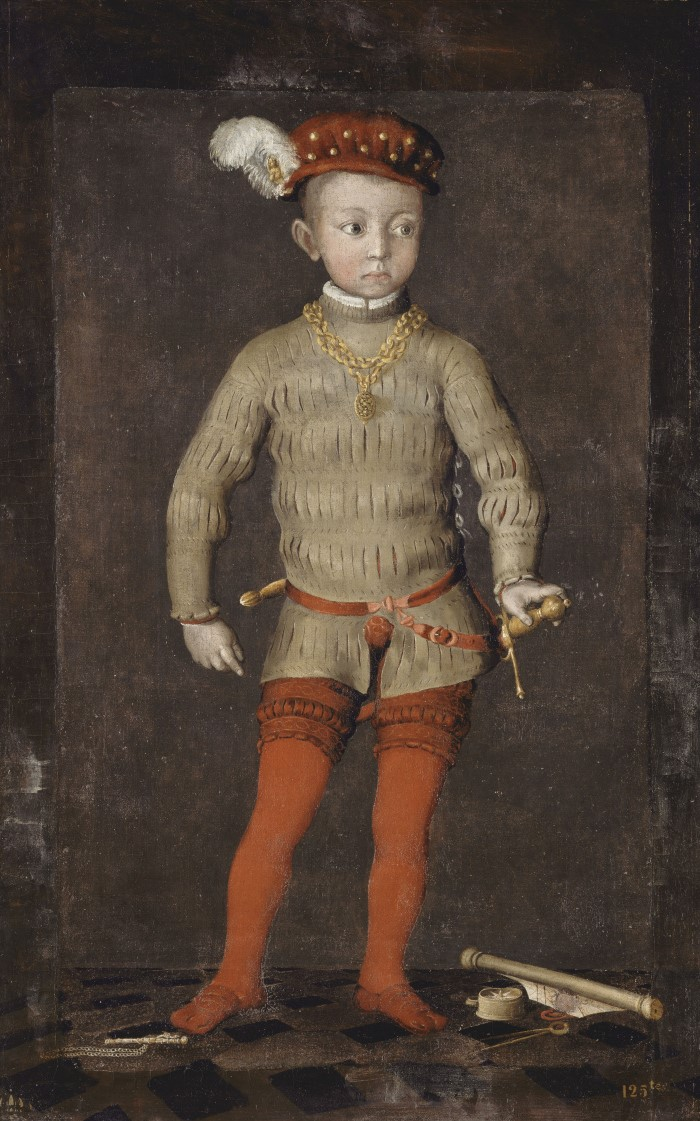
Presumed portrait of Henry as a child

Henry was born on the night of 12-to-13 December 1553 at Pau, the capital of the joint Kingdom of Navarre with the sovereign Principality of Béarn, in his maternal grandfather King Henry II of Navarre's estate, the Château de Pau. He was the son of Jeanne III of Navarre (Jeanne d'Albret) and her husband, Antoine de Bourbon, Duke of Vendôme. As the heir to the throne of Navarre, Henry received the title of Prince of Viana (Prince de Viane). He was baptized in the Roman Catholic Church a few weeks after his birth, on 6 March 1554, at the chapel of the Château de Pau, by Cardinal Georges d'Armagnac. His godfathers were kings Henry II of France and Henry II of Navarre, and his godmothers the Queen of France Catherine de' Medici and Isabella of Navarre, Viscountess of Rohan. During the ceremony, King Henry II of France was represented by the Cardinal de Vendôme.

Henry spent part of his early childhood in the countryside of Béarn at the Château de Coarraze. He frequented the peasants during his hunting trips, and acquired the nickname of "miller of Barbaste" (meunier de Barbaste). Faithful to the spirit of Calvinism, Henry's mother Jeanne d'Albret raised him in its strict morality, according to the precepts of the Reformation. On the accession of Charles IX of France in 1561, Henry was brought to live at the French court in Paris by his father Antoine de Bourbon. Henry's parents disagreed on the choice of his religion, with his mother seeking to educate him in Calvinism, and his father in Catholicism.

== Wars of Religion ==
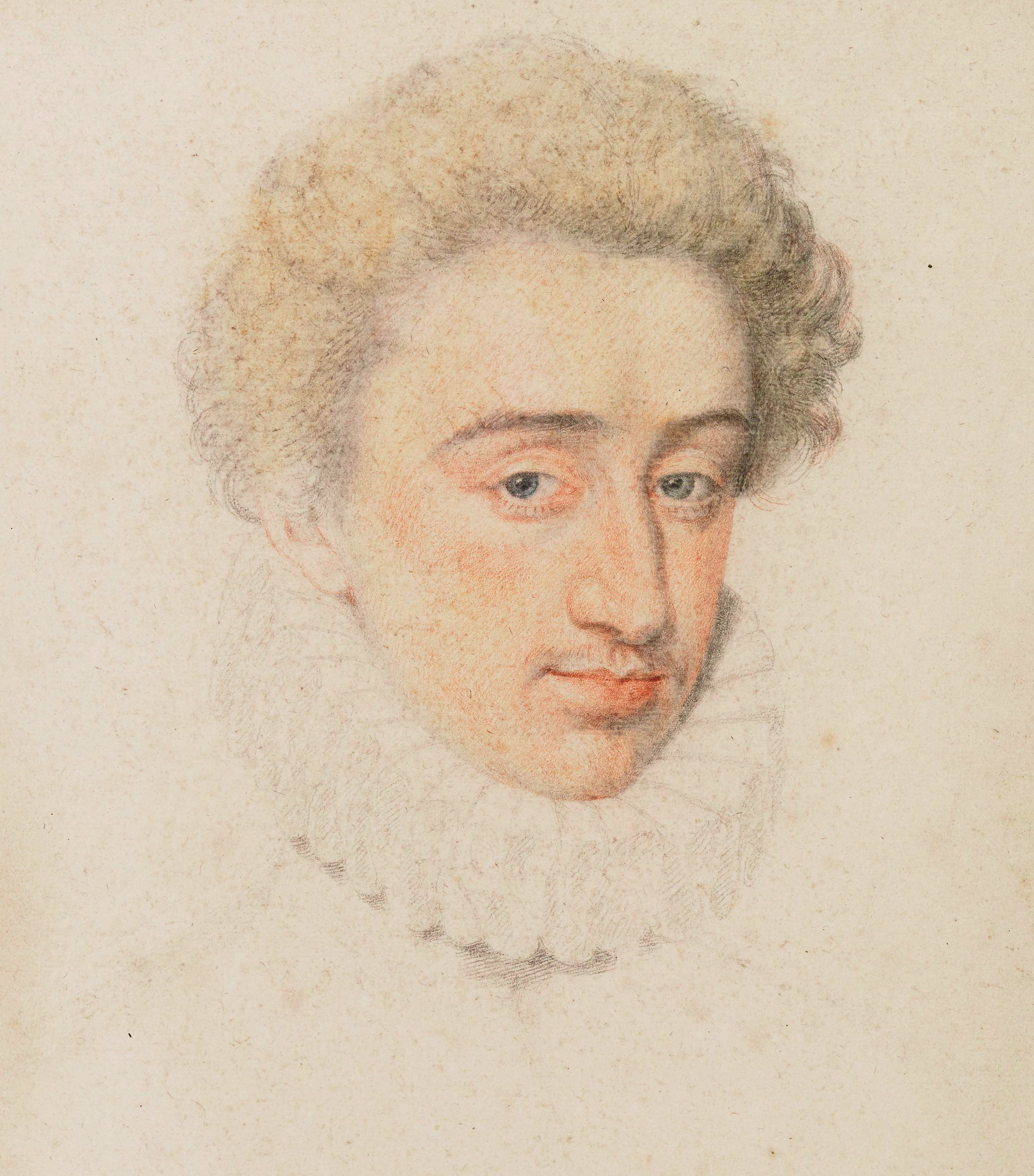
Portrait by Pierre Dumonstier, 1568

During the First French War of Religion (1562–1563), Henry was moved to Montargis for his safety, where he was placed under the protection of Renée of France. After his father's death and the end of the war, he was kept at the French court as a guarantor of the agreement between the monarchy and the Queen of Navarre. Jeanne d'Albret obtained control of his education from Catherine de' Medici and his appointment as governor of Guyenne in 1563. Between 1564 and 1566, Henry accompanied the French royal family in its grand tour of France, and on this occasion reencountered his mother, whom he had not seen for two years. In 1567, Jeanne d'Albret brought him back to live with her in Béarn.

In 1568, Henry took part as an observer in his first military campaign in Navarre, and continued his military instruction during the Third War of Religion (1568–1570). Under the tutelage of Huguenot leader Gaspard II de Coligny, he witnessed the battles of Jarnac, La Roche-l'Abeille, and Moncontour. He saw combat for the first time in 1570, at the Battle of Arnay-le-Duc.

== King of Navarre ==
=== First marriage and Saint Bartholomew's Day Massacre ===
On 9 June 1572, at the death of his mother Queen Jeanne, the 19-year-old Henry became King of Navarre. Upon his accession, it was arranged for Henry to marry Margaret of Valois, daughter of Henry II of France and Catherine de' Medici. The wedding took place in Paris on 18 August 1572 on the parvis of Notre Dame Cathedral.

On 24 August, the St. Bartholomew's Day massacre began in Paris. Several thousand Protestants who had come to Paris for Henry's wedding were killed, as well as thousands more throughout the country in the days that followed. Henry narrowly escaped death thanks to the help of his wife and his promise to convert to Catholicism. He was forced to live at the court of France, but he escaped in early 1576. On 5 February of that year, he formally abjured Catholicism at Tours and rejoined the Protestant forces in the military conflict. He named his 16-year-old sister, Catherine de Bourbon, regent of Béarn. Catherine held the regency for nearly thirty years.

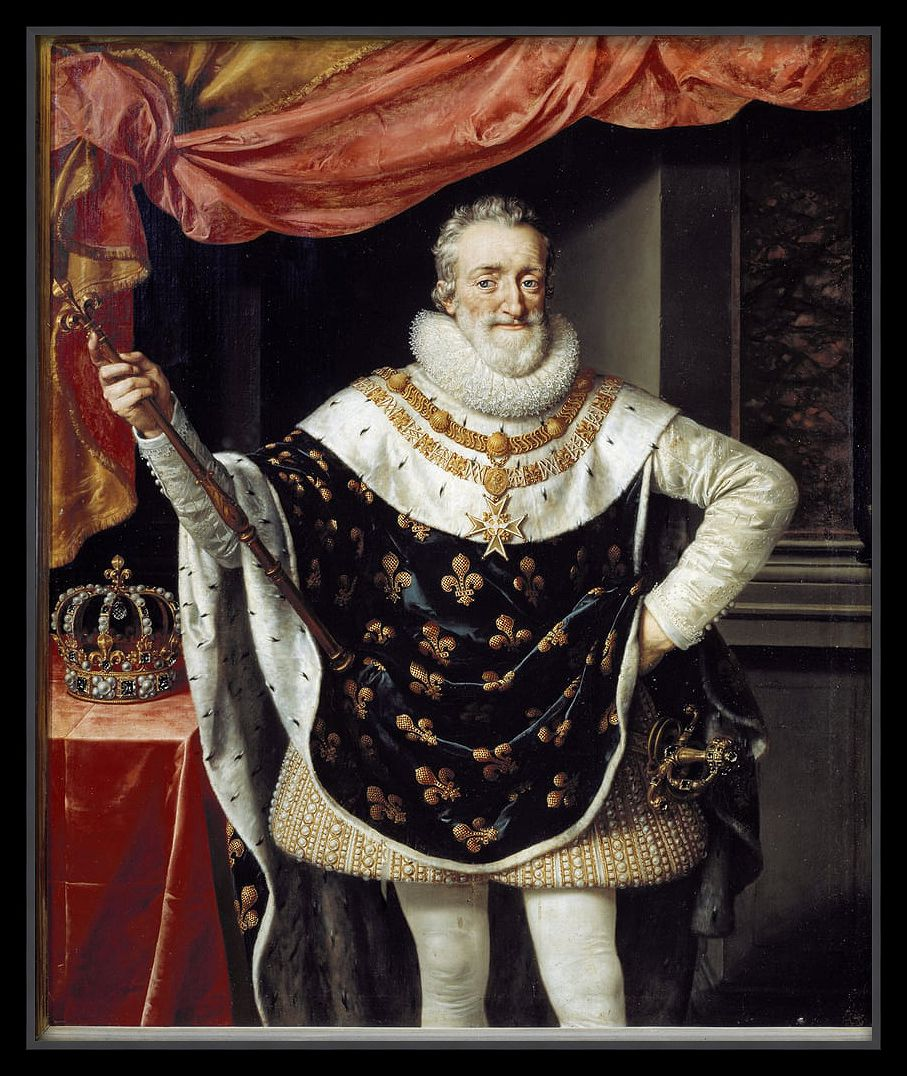
King Henry IV in his coronation robes, by Frans Pourbus the Younger

Henry became heir presumptive to the French throne in 1584 upon the death of Francis, Duke of Anjou, brother and heir to the Catholic Henry III, who had succeeded Charles IX in 1574. Given that Henry of Navarre was the next senior agnatic (male-line) descendant of King Louis IX, King Henry III had no choice but to recognise him as the legitimate successor.

==== War of the Three Henrys (1587–1589) ====
A conflict for the throne of France then ensued, contested by these three men and their respective supporters:

- King Henry III of France, supported by the royalists and the politiques;
- King Henry of Navarre, heir presumptive to the French throne and leader of the Huguenots, supported by Elizabeth I of England and the Protestant princes of Germany; and
- Henry I of Lorraine, Duke of Guise, leader of the Catholic League, funded and supported by Philip II of Spain.

Salic law barred inheritance by the king's sisters and all others who could claim descent through only the female line. However, since Henry of Navarre was a Huguenot, many Catholics refused to acknowledge the succession, and France was plunged into a phase of the Wars of Religion known as the War of the Three Henrys (1587–1589).

The Duke of Guise pushed for complete suppression of the Huguenots and had much support among Catholic loyalists. Political disagreements among the parties set off a series of campaigns and counter-campaigns that culminated in the Battle of Coutras.

In December 1588, King Henry III had the Duke of Guise murdered, along with his brother Louis, Cardinal of Guise, thinking the removal of the brothers would restore his authority. However, the populace was horrified and rose against him. The King was no longer recognized in several cities; his effective power was limited to Blois, Tours, and the surrounding districts.

In the general chaos, Henry III relied on Henry of Navarre and his Huguenots. The two kings were united by a common interest—to win France from the Catholic League. Henry III recognized the King of Navarre as a true subject and Frenchman, not a fanatic Huguenot aiming to subjugate Catholics, and Catholic royalist nobles also rallied to them. With this combined force, the two kings marched to Paris. The morale of the city was low, and even the Spanish ambassador believed the city could not hold out longer than a fortnight. However, on 2 August 1589, a monk infiltrated Henry III's camp and assassinated him.

== King of France: Early reign ==
=== Succession (1589–1594) ===
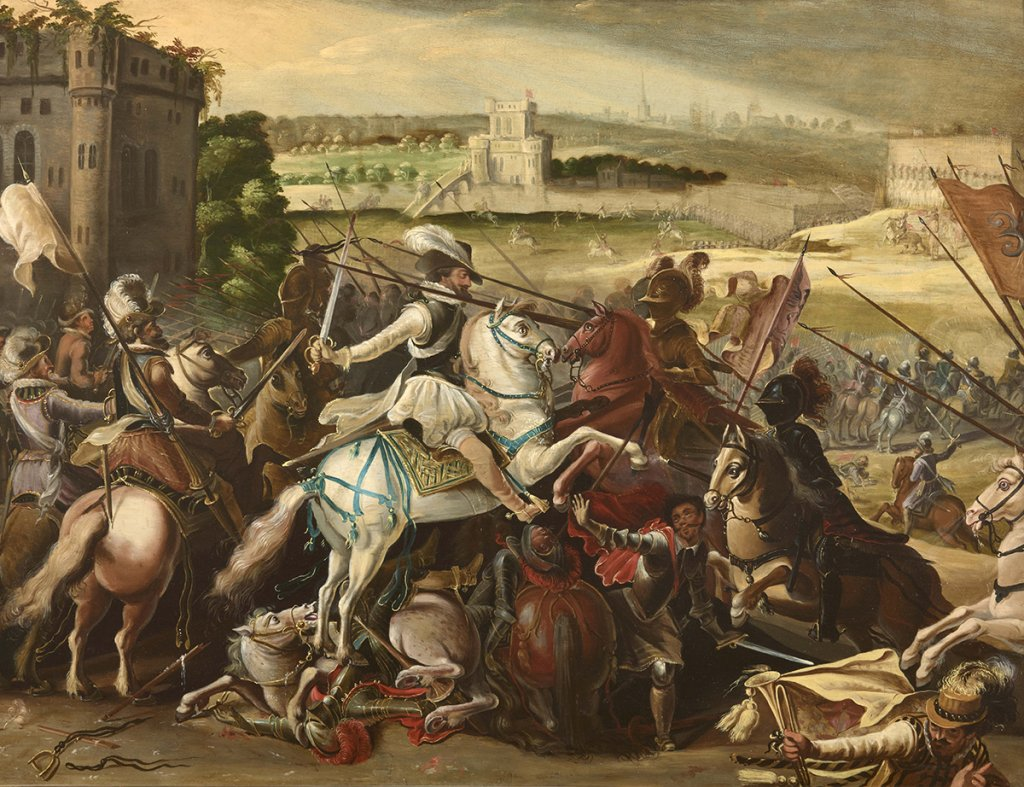
Henry IV at the Battle of Arques

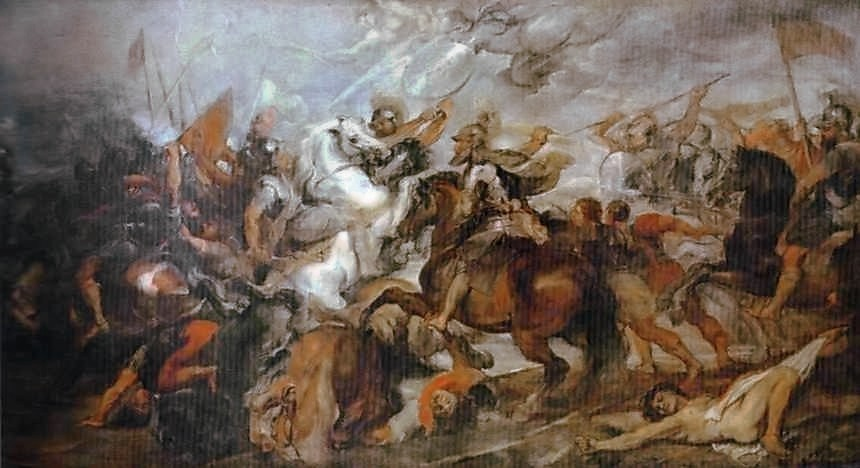
Henry IV at the Battle of Ivry, by Peter Paul Rubens

When Henry III died, his agnatic ninth cousin once removed, Henry of Navarre, nominally became king of France. The Catholic League, however, strengthened by foreign support—especially from Spain—was strong enough to prevent a universal recognition of his new title. Pope Sixtus V excommunicated Henry and declared him ineligible to inherit the crown. Most of the Catholic nobles who had joined Henry III for the siege of Paris also refused to recognize Henry of Navarre, and abandoned him. He set about winning his kingdom by force of arms, aided by English money and German troops. Henry's Catholic uncle Charles, Cardinal de Bourbon, was proclaimed king by the League, but the Cardinal was Henry's prisoner at the time. Henry was victorious at the Battle of Arques and the Battle of Ivry, but failed to take Paris after besieging it in 1590.

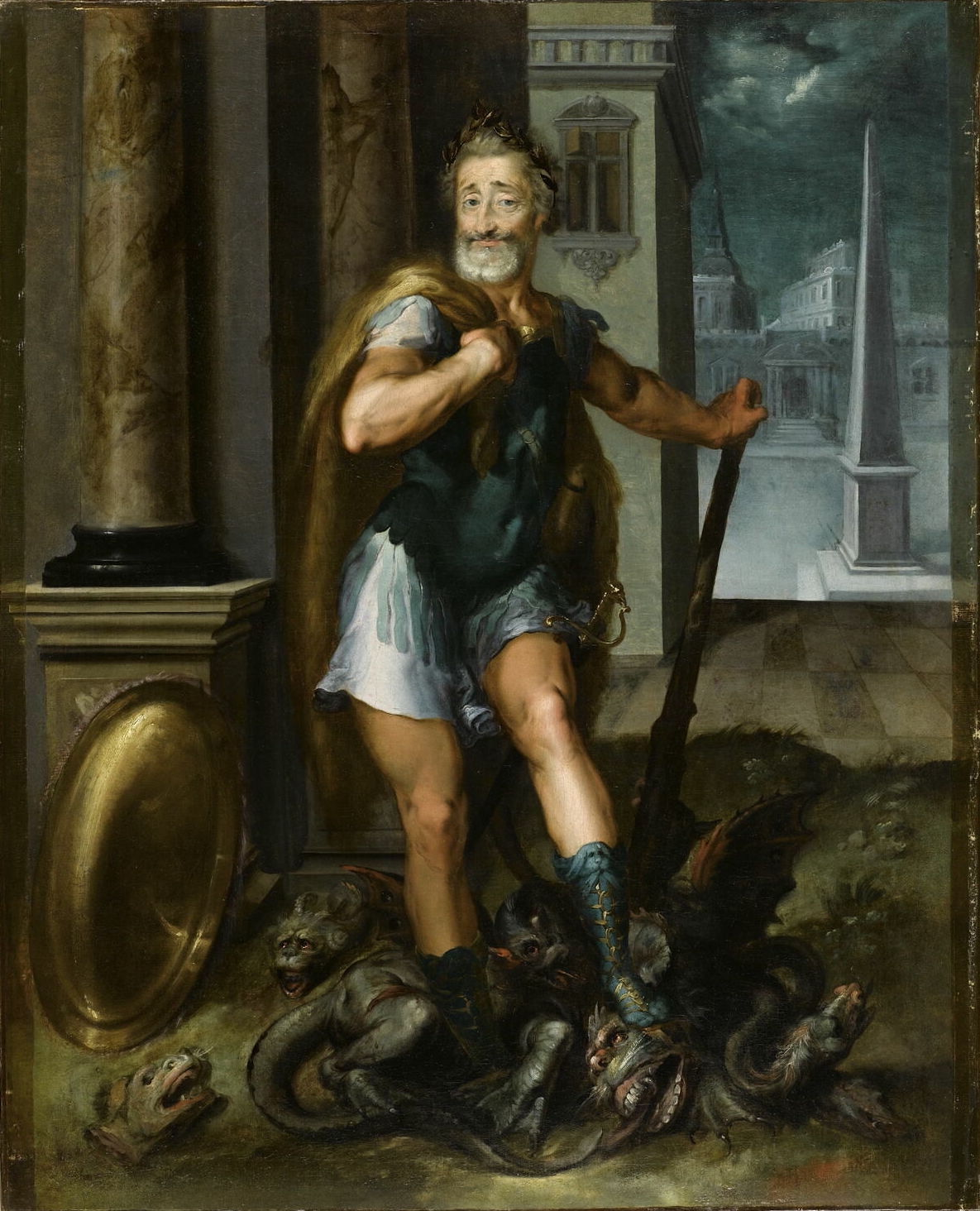
Henry IV, as Hercules, vanquishing the Lernaean Hydra (i.e. the Catholic League), by Toussaint Dubreuil, c. 1600

When Cardinal de Bourbon died in 1590, the League could not agree on a new candidate at the Estates General called to settle the question, also attended by the envoys of Spain. While some supported various Guise candidates, the strongest candidate was probably the Infanta Isabella Clara Eugenia of Spain, daughter of Philip II of Spain, whose mother Elisabeth had been the eldest daughter of Henry II of France. In the religious fervor of the time, the Infanta was considered a suitable queen, provided she married a suitable husband. The French overwhelmingly rejected Philip's first choice, Archduke Ernest of Austria, the Emperor's brother, also a member of the House of Habsburg. In case of such opposition, Philip indicated that princes of the House of Lorraine would be acceptable to him: the Duke of Guise; a son of the Duke of Lorraine; and the son of the Duke of Mayenne. The Spanish ambassadors selected the Duke of Guise, to the joy of the League. However, at that moment of seeming victory, the envy of the Duke of Mayenne was aroused, and he blocked the proposed election of a king.

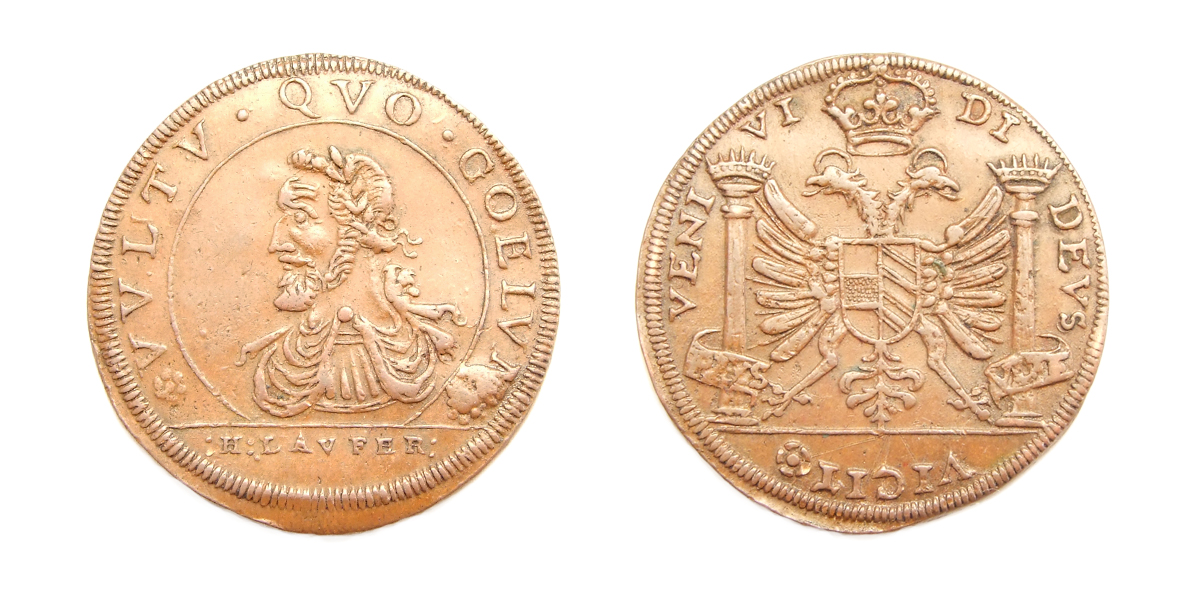
Jeton with portrait of King Henry IV, made in Nuremberg (Germany) by Hans Laufer

The Parlement of Paris also upheld the Salic law. They argued that if the French accepted natural hereditary succession, as proposed by the Spaniards, and accepted a woman as their queen, then the ancient claims of the English kings would be confirmed, and the monarchy of centuries past would be rendered illegal. The Parlement admonished Mayenne, as lieutenant-general, that the kings of France had resisted the interference of the pope in political matters, and that he should not raise a foreign prince or princess to the throne of France under the pretext of religion. Mayenne was angered that he had not been consulted prior to this admonishment, but yielded, since their aim was not contrary to his present views. Despite these setbacks for the League, Henry remained unable to take control of Paris.

=== Conversion to Catholicism: "Paris is well worth a Mass" (1593) ===
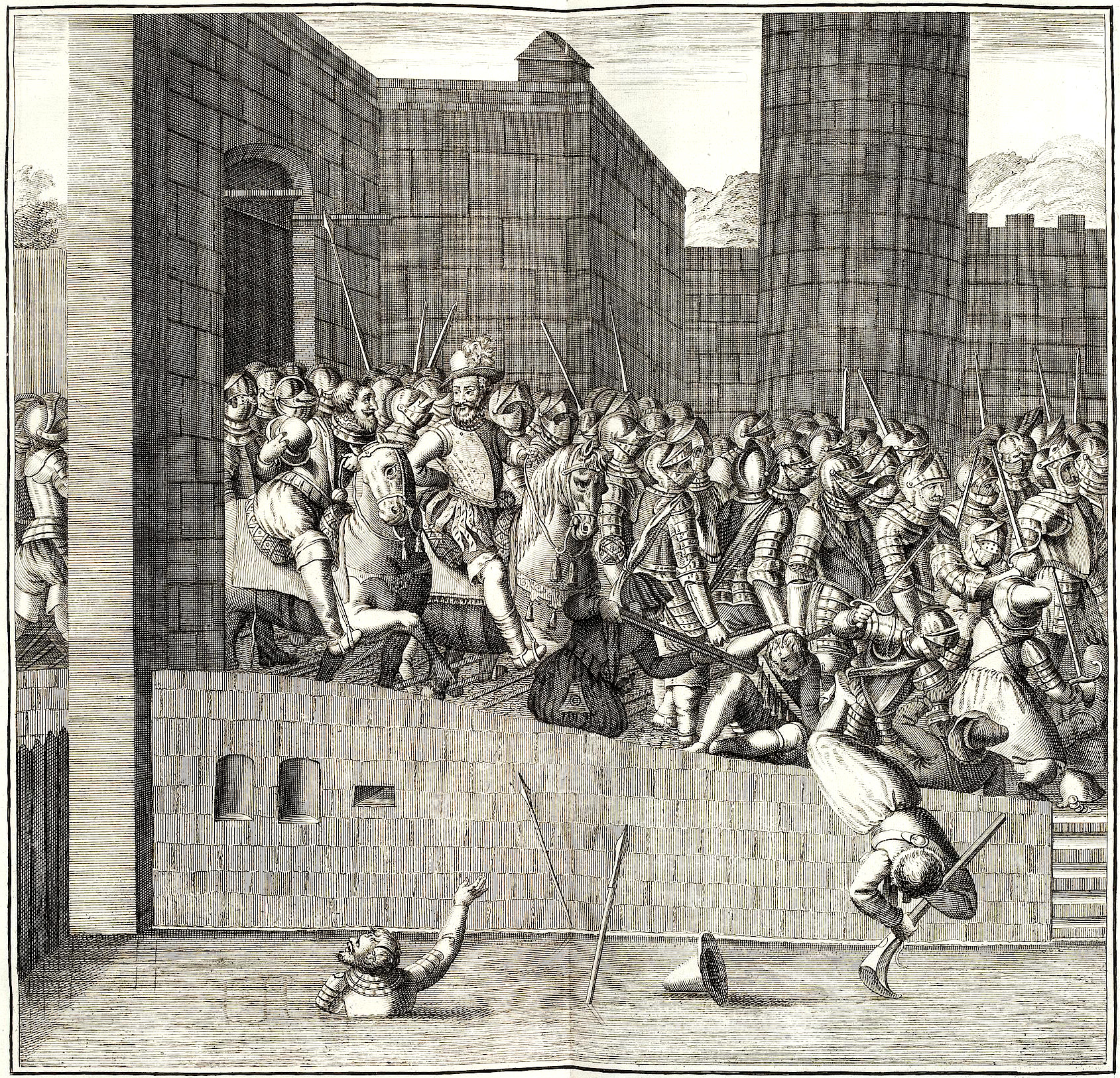
Entrance of Henry IV into Paris on 22 March 1594 with 1,500 cuirassiers

On 25 July 1593, with the encouragement of his mistress, Gabrielle d'Estrées, Henry permanently renounced Protestantism and converted to Catholicism to secure his hold on the French crown, thereby earning the resentment of the Huguenots and his ally Elizabeth I of England. He was said to have declared that Paris vaut bien une messe ("Paris is well worth a Mass"), although the attribution is doubtful. His acceptance of Catholicism secured the allegiance of the vast majority of his subjects.

=== Coronation and recognition (1594–1595) ===
Reims, traditional coronation place of French kings, was still occupied by the Catholic League, and thus Henry was crowned King of France at the Cathedral of Chartres on 27 February 1594. Pope Clement VIII lifted excommunication from Henry on 17 September 1595. He did not forget his former Calvinist coreligionists, however, and was known for his religious tolerance. In 1598 he issued the Edict of Nantes, which granted circumscribed liberties to the Huguenots.

=== Civil war and the Edict of Nantes ===
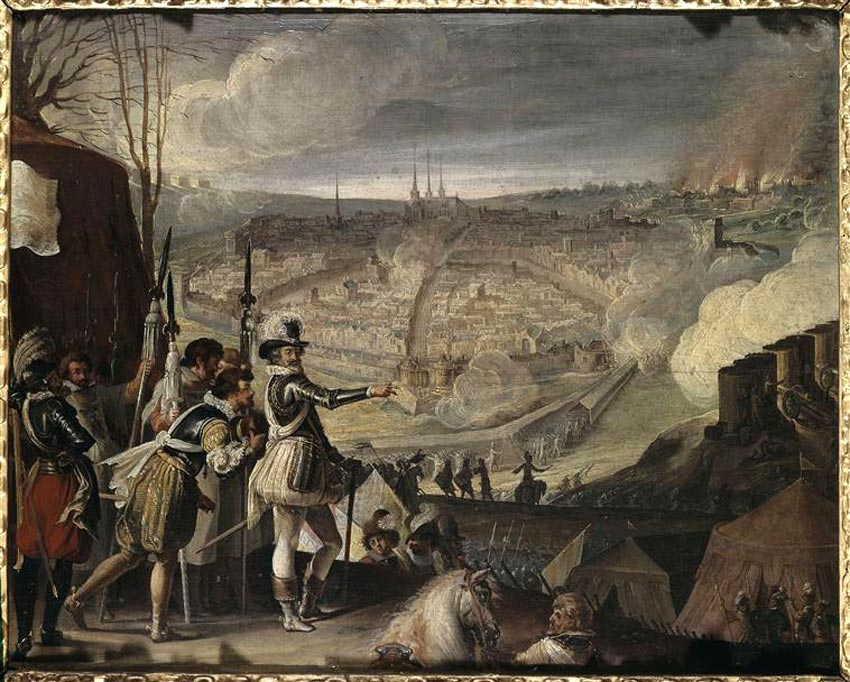
Henry IV during the Siege of Amiens in 1597

Henry IV successfully ended the civil wars. He and his ministers appeased Catholic leaders using bribes of about 7 million écus, a sum greater than France's annual revenue. In combination with other fiscal problems, the king was faced with a financial crisis by the middle of the 1590s. In response to this crisis, Henry resolved to convene an Assembly of Notables in November 1596 that he hoped would approve the creation of new royal revenues. The assembly approved the creation of a new tax on goods entering towns that would be known as the pancarte, however in 1597 the crown was again rocked by military crisis when the Spanish seized Amiens.

Huguenot leaders were placated by the Edict of Nantes, which had four separate sections. The articles laid down the tolerance that would be accorded to the Huguenots including the exact places where worship might or might not take place, the recognition of three Protestant universities, and the allowance of Protestant synods. The king also issued two personal documents (called brevets) which recognized the Protestant establishment. The Edict of Nantes signed religious tolerance into law, and the brevets were an act of benevolence that created a Protestant state within France.

Despite this, it would take years to restore law and order to France. The Edict was met by opposition from the parlements, which objected to the guarantees offered to Protestants. The Parlement de Rouen did not formally register the edict until 1609, although it begrudgingly observed its terms.

== Later reign ==
=== Domestic policies ===
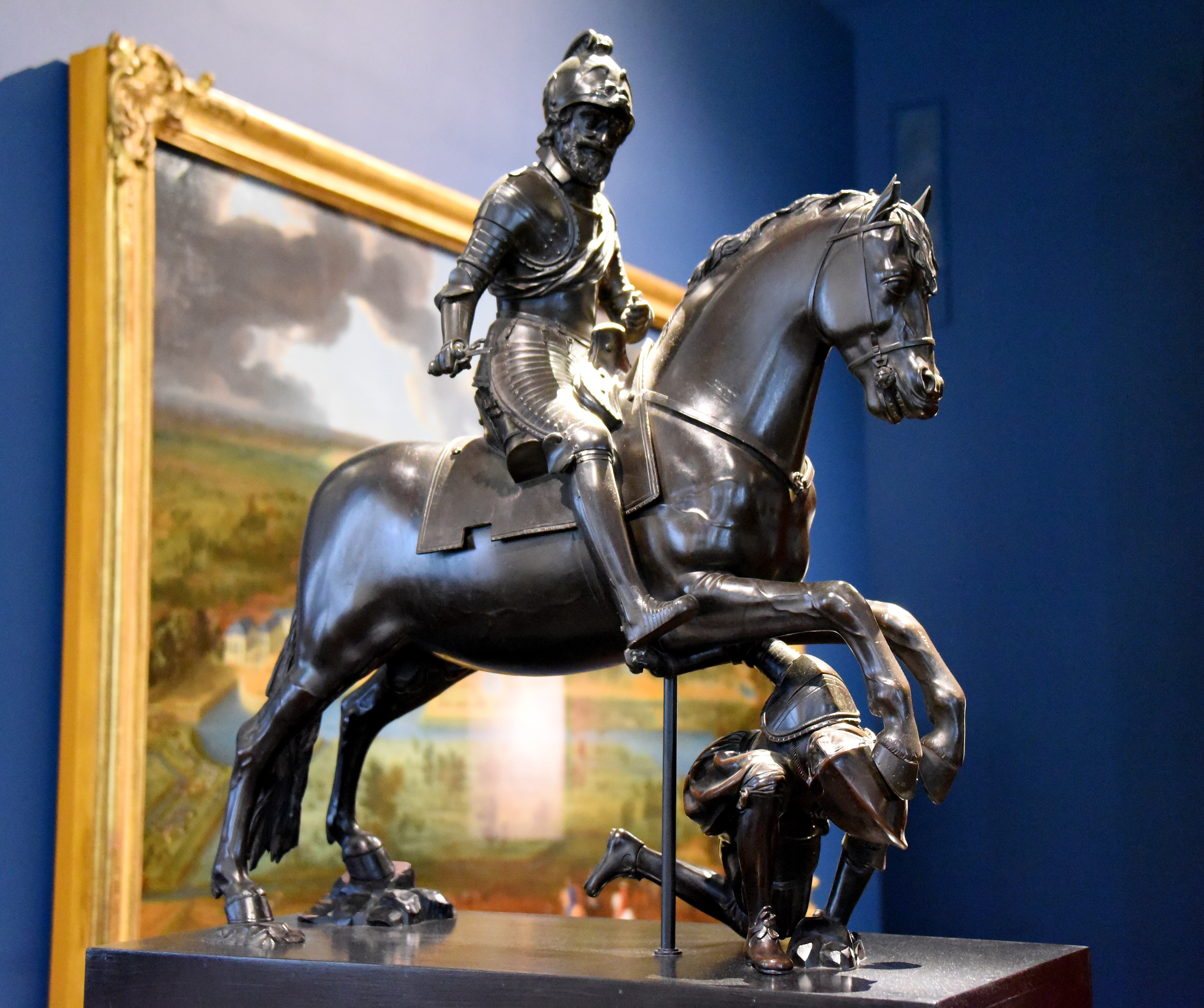
Henri IV on Horseback Trampling his Enemy. Bronze, c. 1615–1620. From France, probably Paris. Victoria and Albert Museum, London

During his reign, Henry IV worked through the minister Maximilien de Béthune, Duke of Sully, to regularize state finance, promote agriculture, drain swamps, undertake public works, and encourage education. He established the Collège Royal Henri-le-Grand in La Flèche (today the Prytanée Militaire de la Flèche). He and Sully protected forests from further devastation, built a system of tree-lined highways, and constructed bridges and canals. He had a 1200-metre canal built in the park at the Château Fontainebleau (which may be fished today) and ordered the planting of pines, elms, and fruit trees.

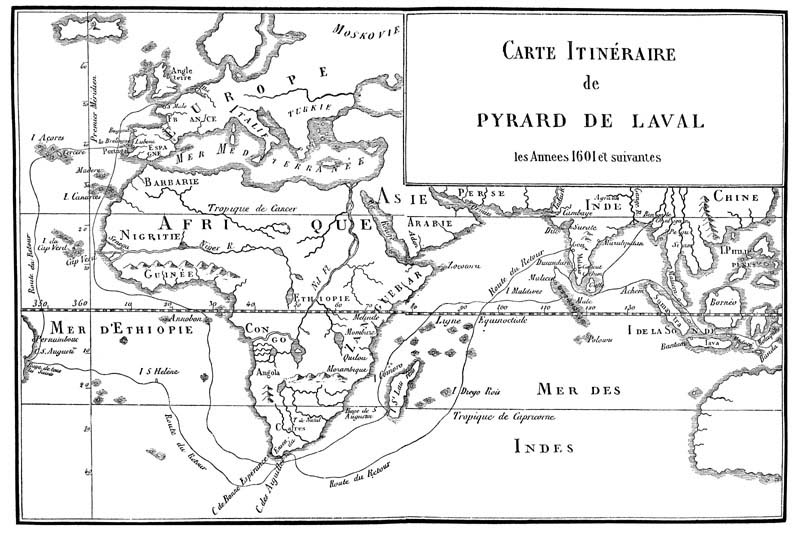
Itinerary of François Pyrard de Laval (1601–1611)

The King restored Paris as a great city, with the Pont Neuf, which still stands today, constructed over the river Seine to connect the Right and Left Banks of the city. Henry IV also built the Place Royale (known since 1800 as Place des Vosges), and added the Grande Galerie to the Louvre Palace. Stretching more than 400 metres along the Seine river bank, at the time it was the longest edifice of its kind in the world. He promoted the arts among all classes of people, and invited hundreds of artists and craftsmen to live and work on the building's lower floors. This tradition continued for another two hundred years, until ended by Napoleon I. The art and architecture of his reign have become known as the Henry IV style.

Economically, Henry IV sought to reduce imports of foreign goods to support domestic manufacturing. To this end, new sumptuary laws limited the use of imported gold and silver cloth. He also built royal factories to produce luxuries such as crystal glass, silk, satin, and tapestries (at Gobelins Manufactory and Savonnerie manufactory workshops). The king re-established silk weaving in Tours and Lyon, and increased linen production in Picardy and Brittany. He had distributed 16,000 free copies of the practical manual The Theatre of Agriculture by Olivier de Serres.

King Henry's vision extended beyond France, and he financed several expeditions of Samuel de Champlain and Pierre Dugua, Sieur de Monts, to North America. France laid claim to New France (now Canada).

=== International relations ===
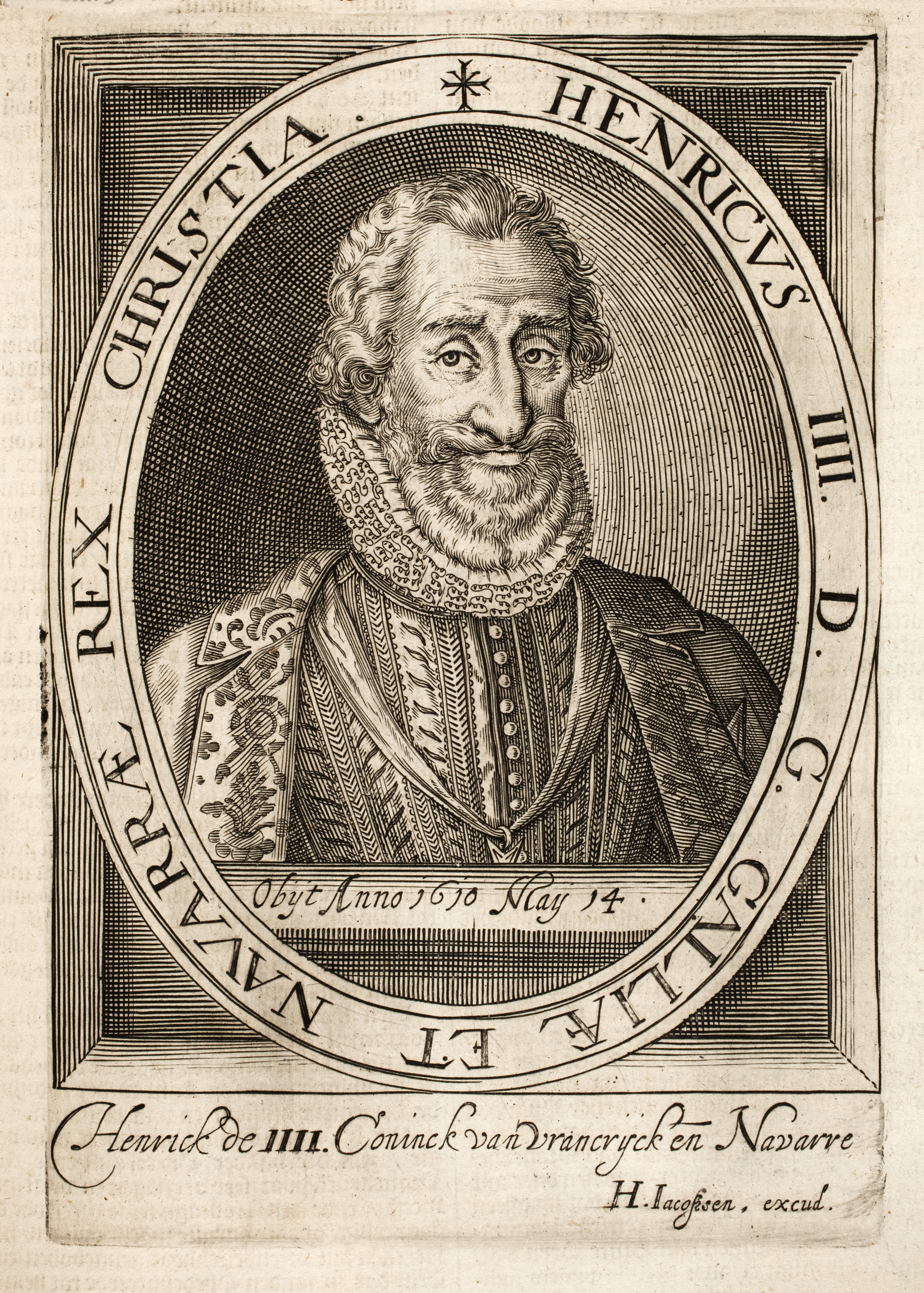
Engraving of Henry IV

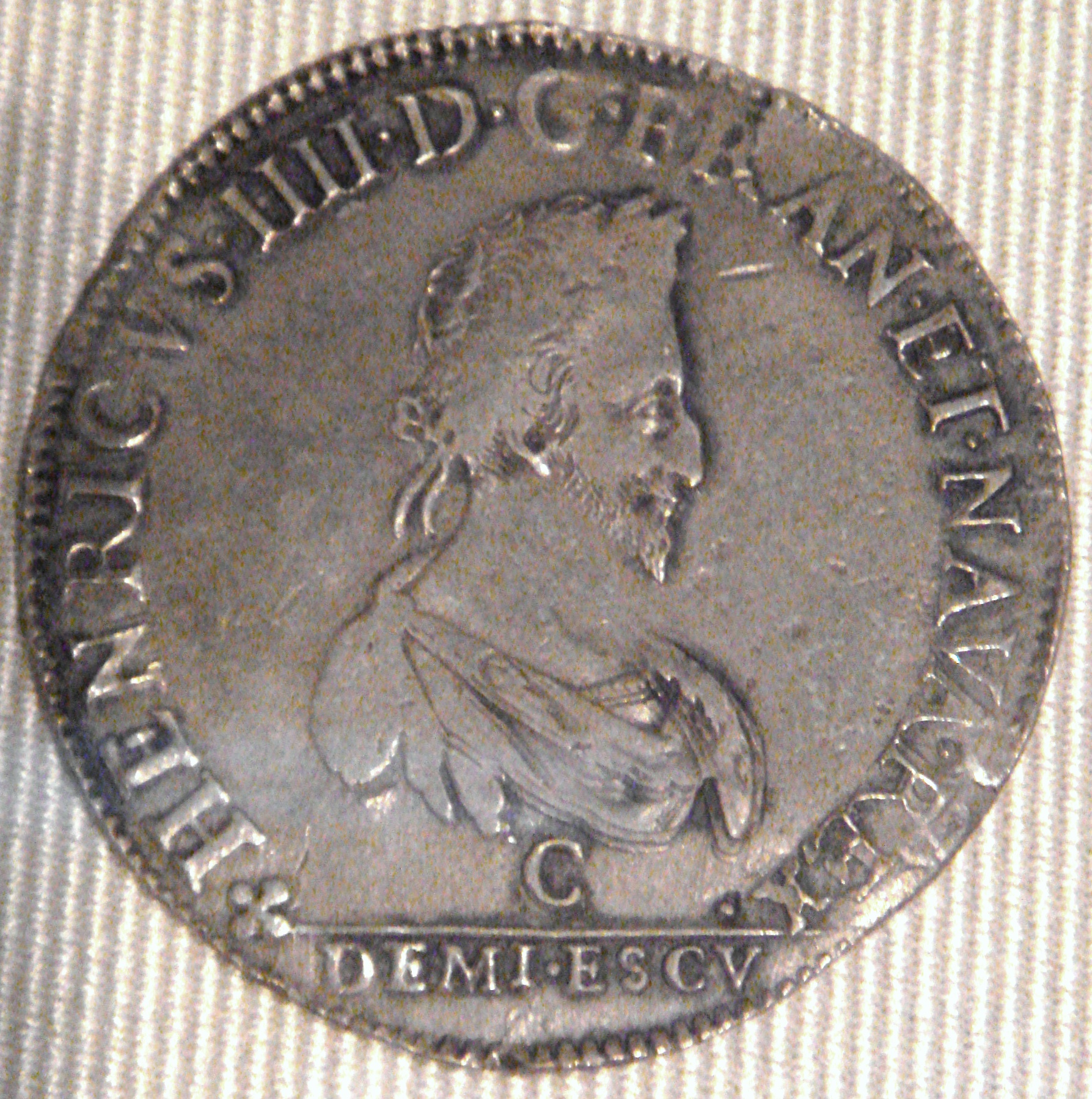
Demi-écu coin of Henry IV, Saint Lô (1589)

During the reign of Henry IV, rivalry continued among France, Habsburg Spain, and the Holy Roman Empire for the mastery of Western Europe. The conflict was not resolved until after the Thirty Years' War.

==== Spain and Italy ====
During Henry's struggle for the crown, Spain had been the principal backer of the Catholic League, and it tried to thwart Henry. Under the Duke of Parma, an army from the Spanish Netherlands intervened in 1590 against Henry and foiled his siege of Paris. Another Spanish army helped the Catholic League nobles opposing Henry to win the Battle of Craon in 1592. The Spanish war was not ended with Henry's coronation, but after his victory at the Siege of Amiens in September 1597, the Peace of Vervins was signed in 1598. This freed his armies to settle the dispute with the Duchy of Savoy, ending with the Treaty of Lyon of 1601, which arranged territorial exchanges.

One of Henry's major problems was the Spanish Road which traversed Spanish territory through Savoy to the Low Countries. His first opportunity to cut the Spanish Road was a dispute over the ownership of the Marquisate of Saluzzo. The last marquis left Saluzzo to the French crown in 1548 (when Savoy was occupied by France), but the territory became disputed during the chaos of the Wars of Religion. The pope was asked to arbitrate between the claims of France and the Duke of Savoy. The Duke offered to cede Bresse to France if he could retain Saluzzo. Henri IV accepted this, but Spain objected that Bresse was a vital part of the Spanish Road, and persuaded the Duke to reject the decision. Henry IV was already at Lyon and had soldiers ready, and four days later he marched fifty thousand men against the duchy, occupying almost all of its area west of the Alps. In January 1601, Henry accepted another offer of papal arbitration and gained not only Bresse, but Bugey and Gex. Savoy retained a narrow corridor through the Val de Chézery. This still allowed Spanish troops to cross from Lombardy to Franche Comté without going through France, but it created a choke point where the Spanish Road was a single bridge across the Rhône River.

The Saluzzo conflict was Henry IV's last major military operation, but he continued to finance Spain's enemies. He generously assisted the Dutch Republic with over 12 million livres between 1598 and 1610. In some years, the payment was 10% of France's total annual budget. France also sent subsidies to Geneva after the Duke of Savoy attempted to capture the city in 1602.

==== Holy Roman Empire ====
In 1609, the death of the childless Johann William, Duke of Jülich-Cleves-Berg, meant that the succession of the wealthy Duchies was in dispute. Henry aimed to maintain peace among the Protestant princes of the Holy Roman Empire to present a united front against the Habsburgs. To achieve this, Henry encouraged a peaceful settlement over the succession between the two main Protestant claimants: Wolfgang Wilhelm of Palatinate-Neuburg and Johann Sigismund of Brandenburg. He communicated this with Maurice, Landgrave of Hesse-Kassel, a significant Protestant leader, who then sought to facilitate an agreement between Wolfgang and Johann Sigismund. When peace was negotiated in the Treaty of Dortmund, Henry sent congratulatory messages to the Protestant claimants, and voiced his support, particularly against the Habsburgs who were likely to challenge the treaty.

When Habsburg forces invaded Jülich, starting the War of the Jülich Succession, Henry decided to act. On 29 July, after consulting his advisors, Henry ordered a French army to support the Protestant claimants. Maximilien de Béthune, Duke of Sully, his financial advisor, was particularly keen on joining the war, as France's finances at the time were secure. Henry declared that he was defending the rights of the Imperial princes, and also that he was honoring his previously agreements to defend the Protestant claimants. Henry also was seeking to curb the power of the Habsburgs.

Henry's actions faced critique. Some saw him as a warmonger. The Papacy in particular was concerned that Henry was supporting Protestant princes. Henry responded to the papacy declaring that he was keeping the peace. When Habsburg ambassadors told Henry that he was contributing to the decline of Catholicism by supporting the Protestant claimants, Henry declared that he was merely trying to contain the Habsburgs. He also warned the Papacy to keep religion out of succession affairs. France assured the Protestant princes of the Empire that despite being Catholic, the French would still provide aid. Henry also sought to gain the aid of the English and Dutch. Henry greatly pressured the Dutch for support, appealing directly to states-general.

Despite Henry's defense of the Protestant princes during the Jülich War, many of the German states distrusted him. After all, Henry had converted to Catholicism in 1593. Also, France owed debts to some German states, which France struggled to repay. There were also concerns that Henry sought to become Emperor. It was widely believed that in 1610 Henry was preparing to escalate the war against the Holy Roman Empire, which was prevented by his assassination and the subsequent rapprochement with Spain under the regency of Marie de' Medici.

==== Ottoman Empire ====
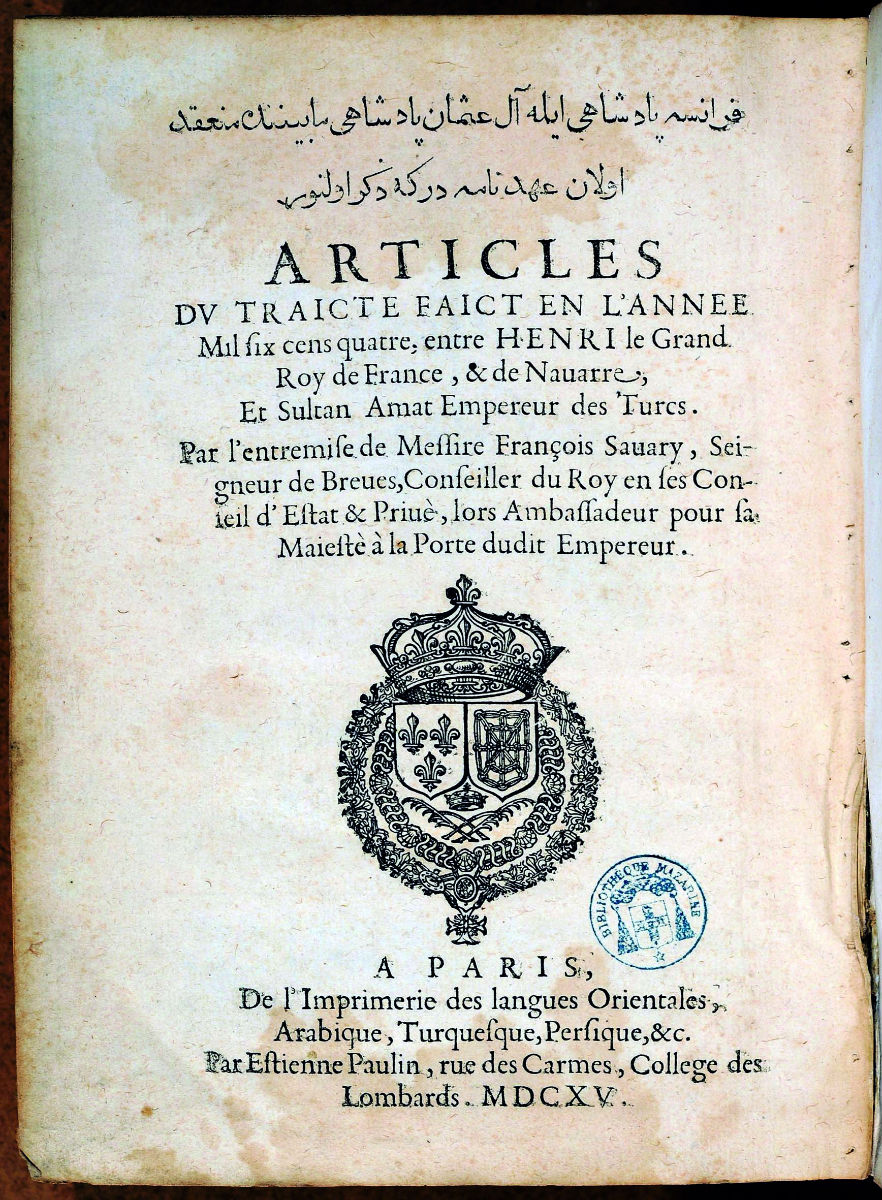
Bilingual Franco-Turkish translation of the 1604 Franco-Ottoman Capitulations between Sultan Ahmed I and Henry IV of France, published by François Savary de Brèves (1615)

Even before Henry's accession to the French throne, the French Huguenots were in contact with Aragonese Moriscos in plans against the Habsburg government of Spain in the 1570s. Around 1575, plans were made for a combined attack of Aragonese Moriscos and Huguenots from Béarn under Henry against Spanish Aragon, in agreement with the Dey of Algiers and the Ottoman Empire, but this project floundered with the arrival of John of Austria in Aragon and the disarmament of the Moriscos. In 1576, a three-pronged Ottoman fleet from Constantinople was planned to disembark between Murcia and Valencia while the French Huguenots would invade from the north and the Moriscos accomplish their uprising, but the fleet failed to arrive.

After his crowning, Henry continued the policy of a Franco-Ottoman alliance and received an embassy from Sultan Mehmed III in 1601. In 1604, a "Peace Treaty and Capitulation" was signed between Henry IV and the Ottoman Sultan Ahmed I, granting France numerous advantages in the Ottoman Empire. In 1606–07, Henry IV sent Arnoult de Lisle as Ambassador to Morocco to request the observance of past friendship treaties. An embassy was sent to Ottoman Tunisia in 1608 led by François Savary de Brèves.

==== East Asia ====
Under Henry IV, various enterprises were set up to develop long-distance trade. In December 1600, a company was formed through the association of Saint-Malo, Laval, and Vitré to trade with the Moluccas and Japan. Two ships, the Croissant and the Corbin, were sent around the Cape of Good Hope in May 1601. The Corbin was wrecked in the Maldives, leading to the adventure of François Pyrard de Laval, who managed to return to France in 1611. The Croissant, carrying François Martin de Vitré, reached Ceylon and traded with Aceh in Sumatra, but was captured by the Dutch on the return leg at Cape Finisterre. François Martin de Vitré was the first Frenchman to write an account of travels to the Far East in 1604, at the request of Henry IV.

From 1604 to 1609, following the return of François Martin de Vitré, Henry attempted to set up a French East India Company on the model of England and the Netherlands. On 1 June 1604, he issued letters patent to Dieppe merchants to form the first French East Indies Company, giving them exclusive rights to Asian trade for 15 years, but no ships were sent until 1616. In 1609, another adventurer, Pierre-Olivier Malherbe, returned from a circumnavigation of the globe and informed Henry of his adventures. He had visited China and India, and met with Emperor Akbar.

=== Religion ===
Historians have assessed that Henry IV was a convinced Calvinist and only changed his formal religious confession to achieve his political goals. Henry IV was baptized as a Catholic on 5 January 1554. He was raised in the Reformed Tradition by his mother Jeanne III of Navarre. In 1572, after the massacre of French Calvinists, he was forced by Catherine de' Medici and the royal court to convert. In 1576, after escaping from Paris, he abjured Catholicism and returned to Calvinism. In 1593, to gain recognition as King of France, he converted again to Catholicism. Although a formal Catholic, he valued his Calvinist upbringing and was tolerant toward the Huguenots until his death in 1610 and issued the Edict of Nantes, which granted them many concessions.

=== Nicknames ===
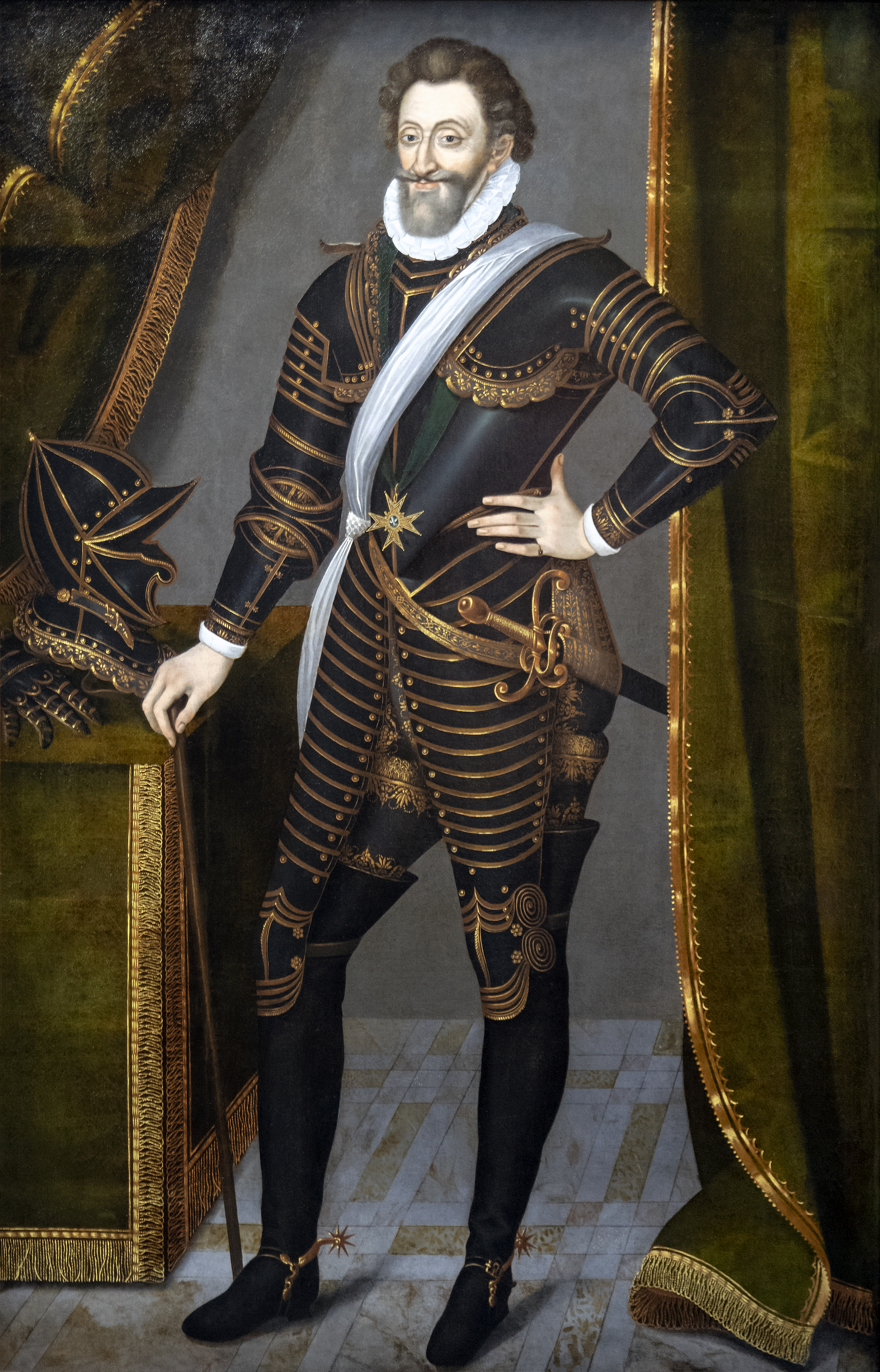
Henry IV, Musée des Augustins

Henry was nicknamed Henri le Grand (the Great), and in France is also called le bon roi Henri (good king Henry) and le vert galant (The Green Gallant) for his numerous mistresses. In English he is most often referred to as Henry of Navarre.

=== Relationship with Charlotte Marguerite de Montmorency ===
In 1609, Henry had grown infatuated with Charlotte Marguerite de Montmorency, Princess of Condé, much to the chagrin of her husband, Henry II, Prince of Condé. On 28 November 1609, the Prince and Princess fled to Brussels in the Spanish Netherlands. King Henry was furious, and believed that the Prince was conspiring against him, so he threatened to raise an army of 60,000 to capture him and bring back the princess. This corresponded with the War of the Jülich Succession, so it added to the tension, especially with Spain.

== Assassination ==
Though generally well-liked, Henry was considered a heretical usurper by some Catholics and a traitor to their faith by some Protestants. Henry was the target of at least 12 assassination attempts, including by Pierre Barrière in August 1593, and by Jean Châtel in December 1594.

Henry was killed in Paris on 14 May 1610 by François Ravaillac, a Catholic zealot who stabbed him while his coach was stopped on Rue de la Ferronnerie. The carriage was stopped by traffic congestion associated with the Queen's coronation ceremony, as depicted in the engraving by Gaspar Bouttats. Hercule de Rohan, riding in the coach with the king, was wounded in the attack but survived. Ravaillac was immediately seized, and executed days later. Henry was entombed at the Basilica of Saint Denis. His widow, Marie de' Medici, served as regent for their nine-year-old son, Louis XIII, until 1617.

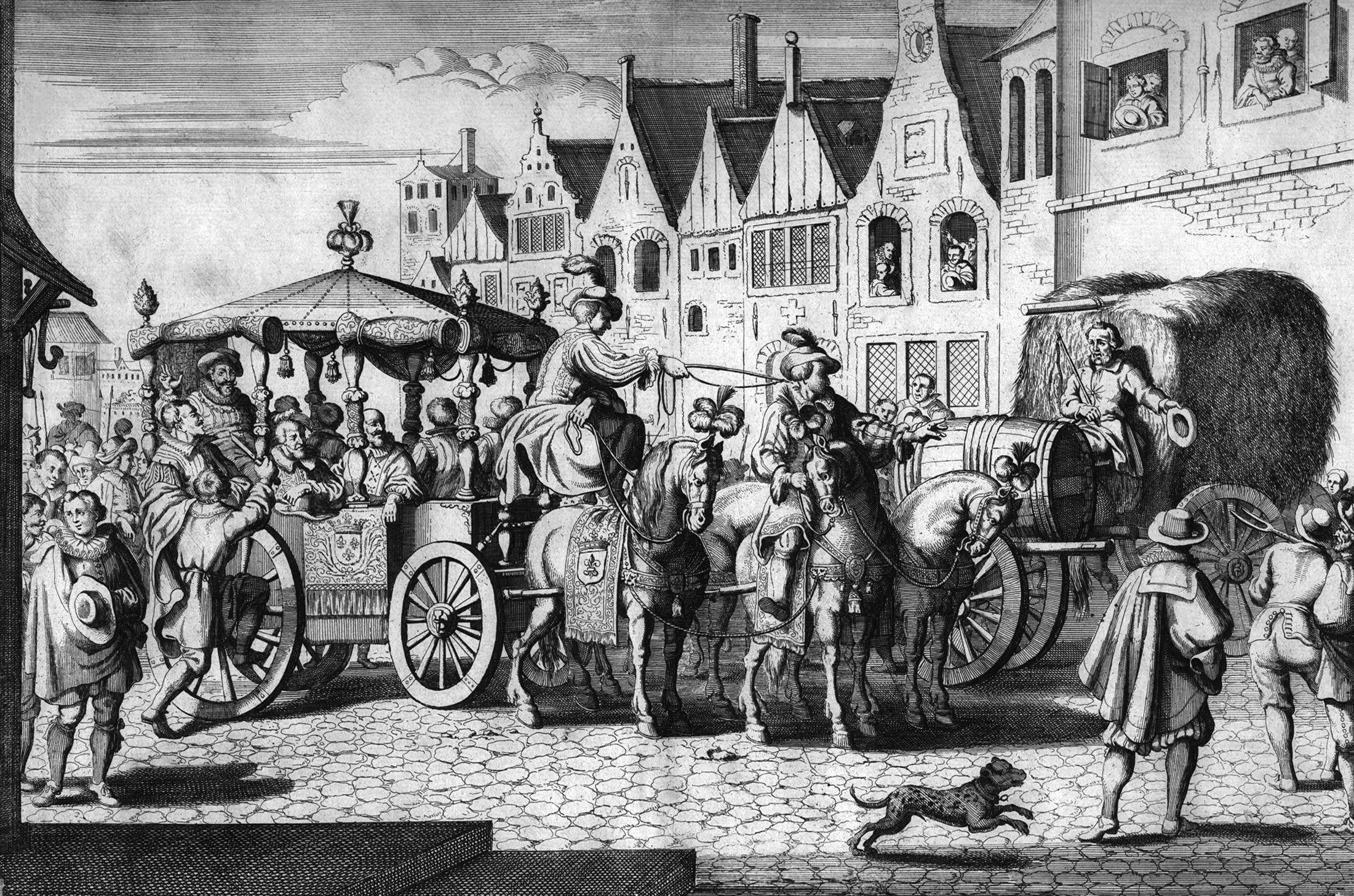
Assassination of Henry IV,
engraving by Gaspar Bouttats

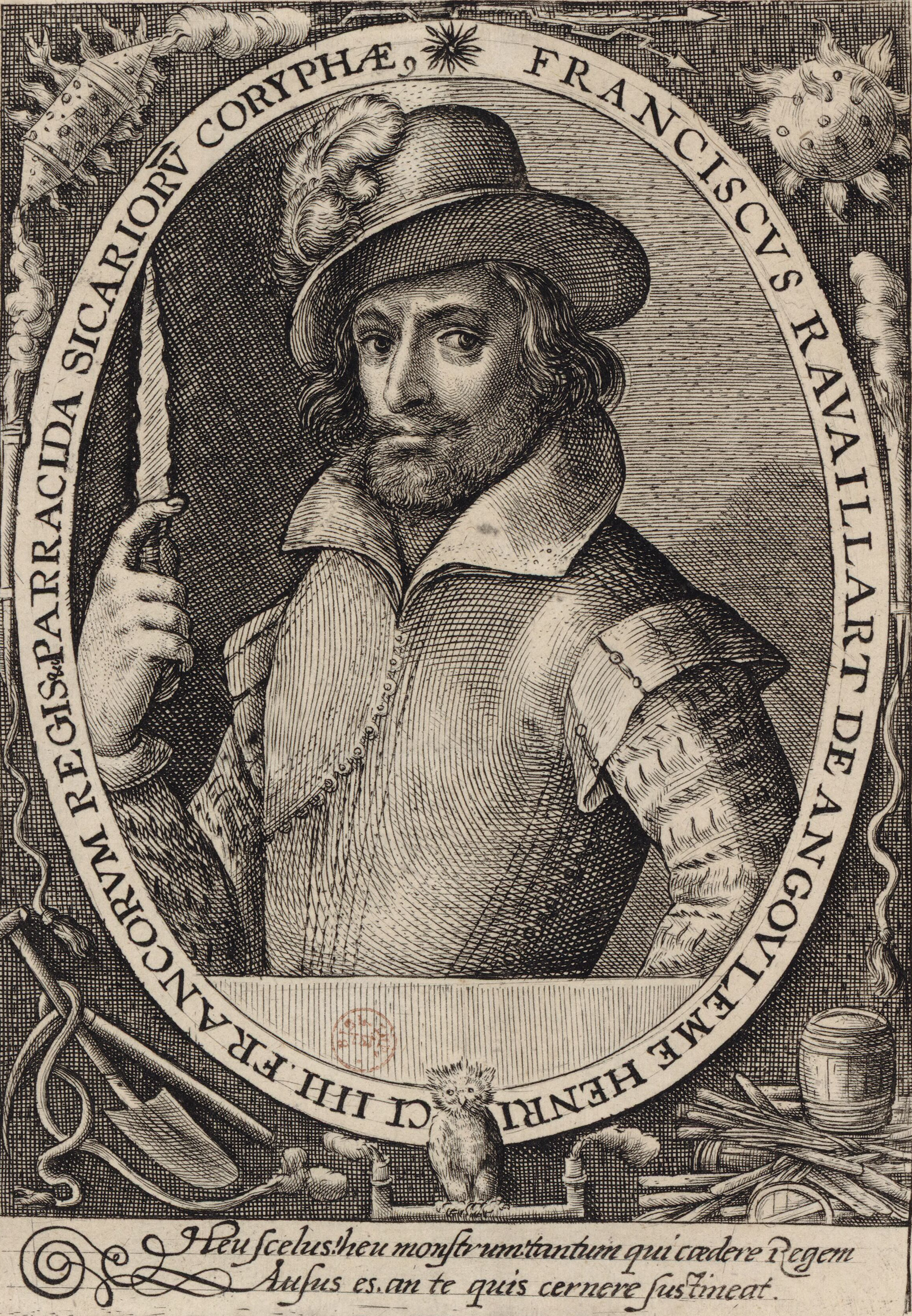
His assassin, François Ravaillac, brandishing his dagger

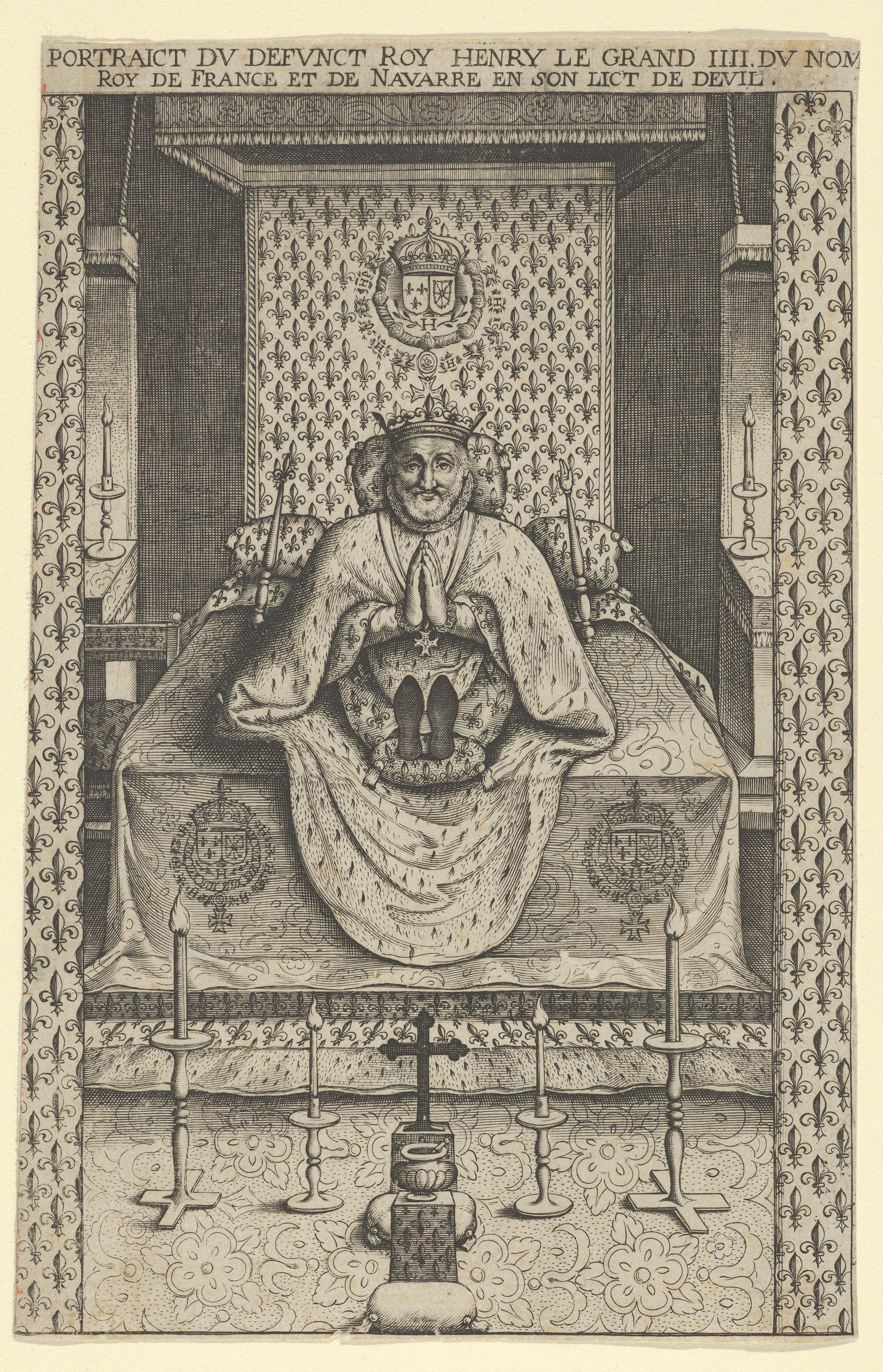
The Deceased Henry IV in His Deathbed published by Pierre Firens, 1610

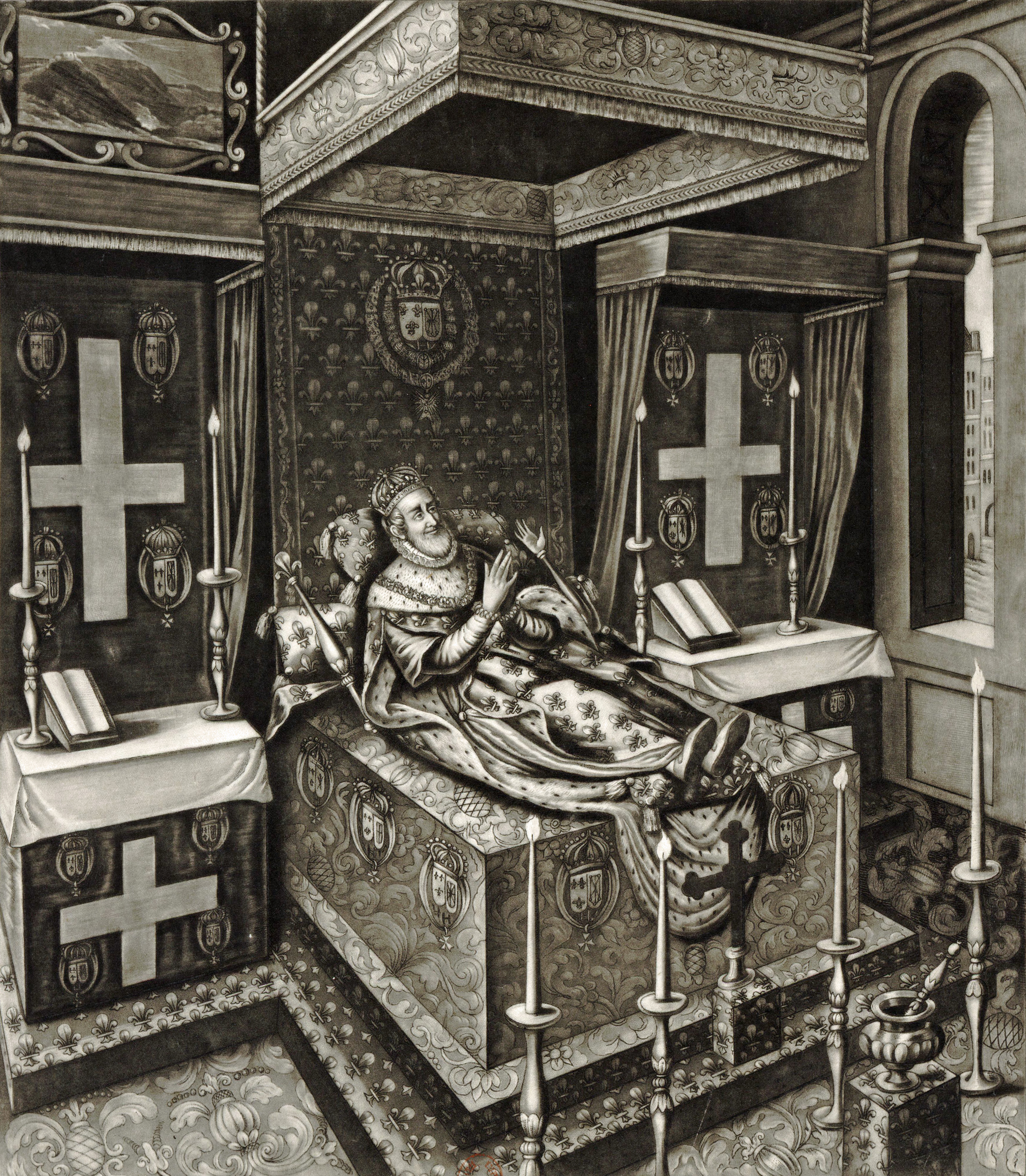
Lying in state at the Louvre, engraving after François Quesnel

== Legacy ==
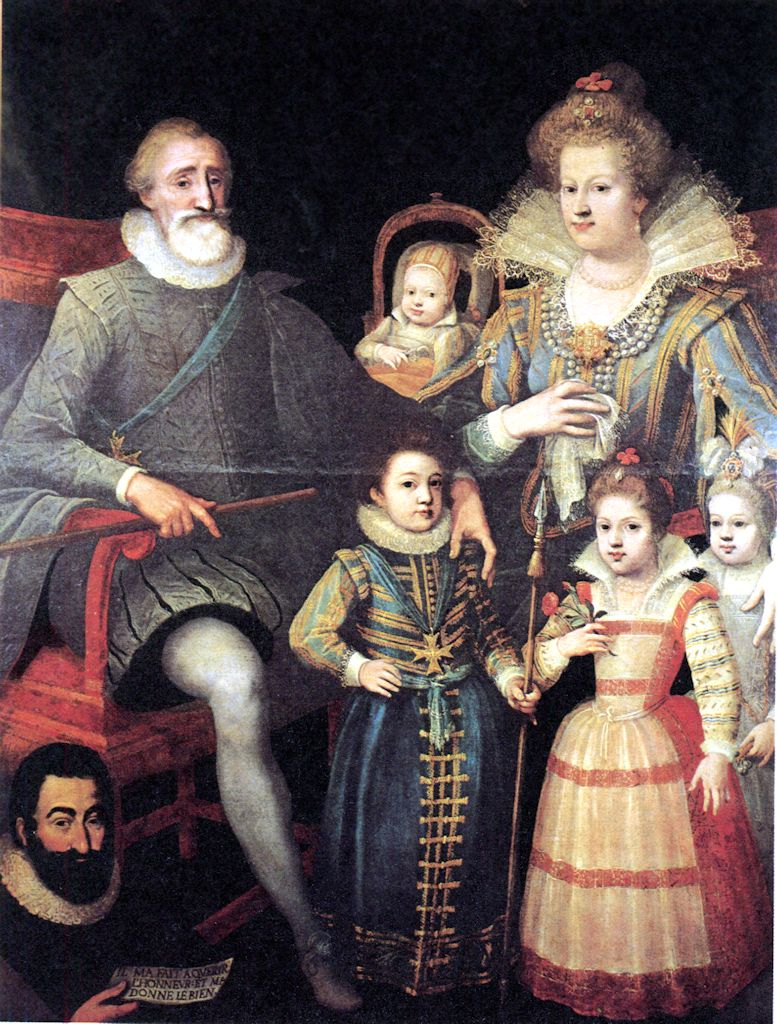
Henri IV, Marie de' Medici and family

In 1614, four years after Henry IV's death, his statue was erected on the Pont Neuf. During the early phase of the French Revolution, when it aimed to create a constitutional monarchy rather than a republic, Henry IV was held up as a model for King Louis XVI. When the Revolution radicalized and came to reject monarchy altogether, Henry IV's statue was torn down along with other royal monuments. It was nevertheless the first to be rebuilt, in 1818, and it still stands on the Pont Neuf today.

Henry IV was much lauded during the Bourbon Restoration (1814–1830), as the restored dynasty was keen to play down the controversial reigns of Louis XV and Louis XVI in favour of Good King Henry. The song Marche Henri IV (Henry IV March, also called Long Live Henry IV) was popular. After the assassination in 1820 of the indirect heir to the throne, Charles Ferdinand, Duke of Berry, by a republican fanatic, his widow Princess Caroline gave birth seven months later to their son, heir to the throne of France, and conspicuously named him Henri after his royal forefather.

The boy was baptised with Jurançon wine and garlic in the tradition of Béarn and Navarre, as Henry IV had been baptised in Pau. Henry serves as a loose inspiration for the character Ferdinand, King of Navarre, in William Shakespeare's 1590s play Love's Labour's Lost.

A 1661 biography, Histoire du Roy Henry le Grand, was written by Hardouin de Péréfixe de Beaumont for the edification of Henry's grandson Louis XIV. A 1663 English translation was published for another grandson, King Charles II of England. On 14 September 1788, when anti-tax riots broke out during the incipient French Revolution, rioters stopped travellers and demanded they dismount to salute Henry IV's statue. Henry's minister Sully published his Royal Economies in 1611 after de Sully's fall from power, but subsequent research has shown that it exaggerates the economic accomplishments of Sully's ministry. Many of the official source documents were altered, or even forged to make them more impressive.

== Genealogy ==
=== Ancestry ===
Ancestors of Henry IV of France

8. Francis, Count of Vendôme
4. Charles, Duke of Vendôme
9. Marie of Luxembourg
2. Anthony of Navarre
10. René, Duke of Alençon
5. Françoise of Alençon
11. Margaret of Lorraine
1. Henry IV of France
12. John III of Navarre
6. Henry II of Navarre
13. Catherine of Navarre
3. Jeanne d'Albret
14. Charles, Count of Angoulême
7. Marguerite of Angoulême
15. Louise of Savoy

== Marriages and legitimate children ==
On 18 August 1572, Henry married his second cousin Margaret of Valois. The marriage was not a happy one, and the couple was childless. Henry and Margaret separated even before Henry acceded to the throne in August 1589; Margaret retired to the Château d'Usson in the Auvergne and lived there for many years. After Henry became king of France, it was of the utmost importance that he provide an heir to the crown to avoid the problem of a disputed succession.

Henry favoured the idea of obtaining an annulment of his marriage to Margaret and marrying his mistress Gabrielle d'Estrées, who had already borne him three children. Henry's councillors strongly opposed this idea, but the matter was resolved unexpectedly by Gabrielle's sudden death in the early hours of 10 April 1599, after she had given birth to a premature stillborn son. His marriage to Margaret was annulled in 1599. On 17 December 1600, Henry married Marie de' Medici, daughter of Francesco I de' Medici, Grand Duke of Tuscany, and Archduchess Joanna of Austria.

For the royal entry of Marie into Avignon on 19 November 1600, the citizens bestowed on Henry the title of the Hercule Gaulois ("Gallic Hercules"), concocting a genealogy that traced the House of Navarre back to a nephew of Hercules' son Hispalus. His marriage to Marie de' Medici produced six children:

Name	Birth	Death	Notes
Louis XIII, King of France	27 September 1601	14 May 1643	Married Anne of Austria in 1615
Elisabeth, Queen of Spain	22 November 1602	6 October 1644	Married Philip IV, King of Spain, in 1615
Christine, Duchess of Savoy	10 February 1606	27 December 1663	Married Victor Amadeus I, Duke of Savoy, in 1619
Monsieur d'Orléans	16 April 1607	17 November 1611	Never baptised or named; sometimes erroneously called "Nicolas".
Gaston, Duke of Orléans	25 April 1608	2 February 1660	Married (1) Marie de Bourbon, Duchess of Montpensier, in 1626; Married (2) Marguerite of Lorraine in 1632
Henrietta Maria, Queen of England, Queen of Scots, and Queen of Ireland	25 November 1609	10 September 1669	Married Charles I, King of England, King of Scots and King of Ireland, in 1625

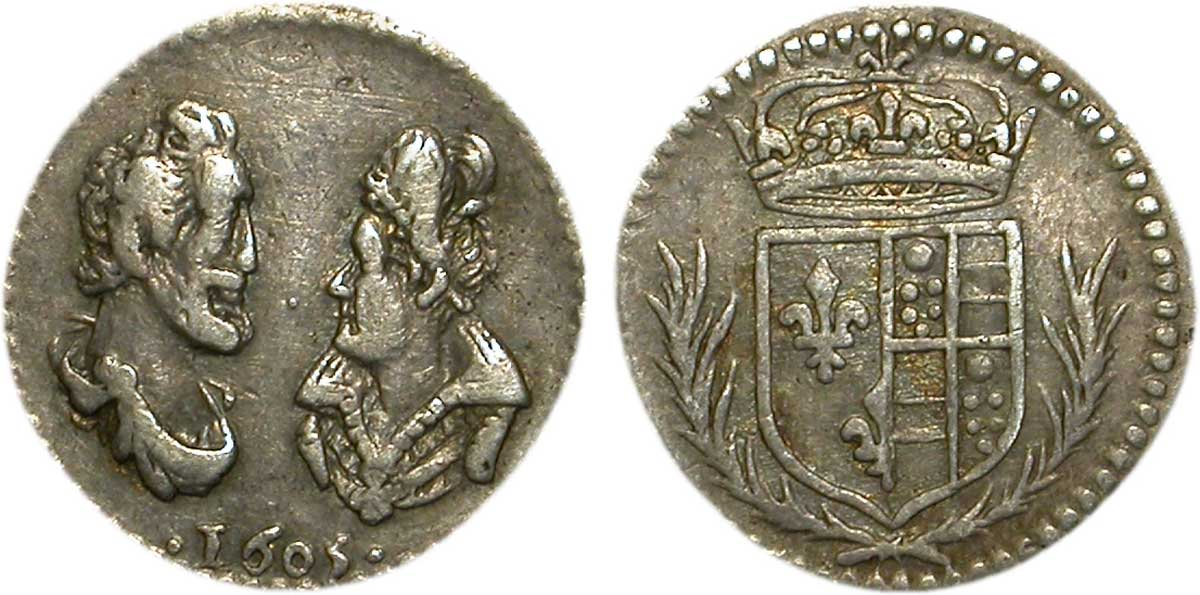
Henry IV and Marie de' Medici

== Armorial ==
The arms of Henry IV changed throughout his lifetime:

From 1562,
as Prince of Béarn and Duke of Vendôme

From 1572,
as King of Navarre

From 1589,
as King of France and Navarre (also used by his successors)

Grand royal coat of arms of Henry and the House of Bourbon as kings of France and Navarre (1589–1789)

Henry III of Navarre & IV of France House of Bourbon Cadet branch of the Capetian dynasty Born: 13 December 1553 Died: 14 May 1610
Regnal titles
Preceded by Jeanne III	King of Navarre; 9 June 1572 – 14 May 1610	Succeeded by Louis XIII and II
Preceded by Henry III	King of France; 2 August 1589 – 14 May 1610	Succeeded by Louis XIII and II
French nobility
Preceded by Antoine of Navarre	Duke of Vendôme and Beaumont; Count of Marle, La Fère, and Soissons; 17 November 1562 – 2 August 1589	Merged into the crown
Preceded by Jeanne III of Navarre	Duke of Albret; Count of Foix, Armagnac, Comminges, Bigorre, Limoges, and Périgord; Viscount of Béarn; Lord of Donezan; 9 June 1572 – 2 August 1589	Merged into the crown
