= Papal mediation in the Beagle conflict =

Papal international mediation in Chile Argentina dispute

Signing of the agreement in Rome: Argentine Minister of Foreign Affairs Dante Caputo (left); Agostino Casaroli (middle); Chilean Minister of Foreign Affairs Jaime del Valle (right)

The papal mediation in the Beagle conflict followed the failure of negotiations between Chile and Argentina, when, on 22 December 1978, the Argentinian Junta started Operation Soberanía, to invade Cape Horn and islands awarded to Chile by the Beagle Channel Arbitration. Soon after the event, Pope John Paul II offered to mediate and sent his personal envoy, Cardinal Antonio Samoré, to Buenos Aires. Argentina, in acceptance of the authority of the Pope over the overwhelmingly Catholic Argentine population, called off the military operation and accepted the mediation. On 9 January 1979, Chile and Argentina signed the Act of Montevideo formally requesting mediation by the Vatican and renouncing the use of force.

== Interests of the parties ==
The mediator acted to defuse the situation by negotiating an agreement that stopped the immediate military crisis. Then the Vatican crafted a six-year process that allowed the parties to grapple with increasingly difficult issues, including navigation rights, sovereignty over other islands in the Fuegian Archipelago, delimitation of the Straits of Magellan, and maritime boundaries south to Cape Horn and beyond.

- Chile considered the Arbitral Award of 1977 "…fully operative and obligatory in law…" as expressed by the Court of Arbitration after the Argentine Refusal.
- Argentina repudiated the International Arbitral Award that the government of Alejandro Lanusse had solicited in 1971.
- Argentina extended its claim to all territories southward of Tierra del Fuego and eastward of the Cape Horn-meridian. That is, Argentina claimed the islands Horn, Wollastone, Deceit, Barnevelt, Evouts, Herschell, etc.

The 1978 military mobilization revealed other latent international relations issues between the two countries that had been previously overlooked or ignored.

== Mediator ==
By the beginning of November 1978, Chile and Argentina no longer had any mechanism for working toward a peaceful settlement and the situation began to destabilize rapidly. It was at this point, with direct talks dead and a judicial settlement refused by Argentina, that Chile suggested mediation. Argentina accepted the proposal and the two foreign ministers agreed to meet in Buenos Aires on 12 December for the purpose of selecting a mediator and the terms of mediation. Possible candidates were

- Jimmy Carter, President of the United States of America,
- the Organization of American States,
- Juan Carlos I of Spain, King of Spain,
- a European president,
- Pope John Paul II.

The ministers concurred on the issue that the Pope should mediate the dispute, but their agreement proved ephemeral. In the evening, as the Chilean delegation was studying the documents for signature, the Argentine minister called the Chilean minister Cubillos to tell him that President Videla, who had approved their choice of mediator, had been stripped of his authority by the junta.

On 22 December 1978, Argentina launched Operation Soberania to occupy the islands militarily. On the morning of 22 December, Pope John Paul II, on his own initiative, contacted both governments directly to communicate that he was sending a personal envoy to Buenos Aires and Santiago.

Mediator and the heads of state

Jorge Rafael Videla, Argentine Head of State

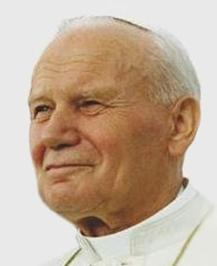
Pope John Paul II, mediator between Chile and Argentina

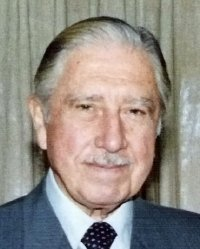
Augusto Pinochet, Chilean Head of State

== The Act of Montevideo ==
In Montevideo, Uruguay, on 8 January 1979, both countries signed the Act of Montevideo. In this treaty the parties agreed to:

- no restrictions whatsoever over the mediation (textual: "…they will raise no objection to the expression by the Holy See, during these proceedings, of such ideas as its thorough studies on a disputed aspects of the problem of the southern zone may suggest to it, with a view to contributing to a peaceful settlement acceptable to both Parties…")
- "…Antonio Cardinal Samoré … asks that that request [of mediation] should be accompanied by an undertaking that the two States will not resort to the use of force in their mutual relations, will bring about a gradual return to the military situation existing at the beginning of 1977 and will refrain from adopting measures that might impair harmony in any sector.…".

The treaty gave the mediator a broad framework in which to negotiate without any geographical data or temporal restrictions.

Pope John Paul II, the Chilean and the Argentine delegations at the beginning of the mediation, 1979. From left to right: Monsignor Faustino Saénz Muñoz, Susana Ruiz Ceruti, Counsellor Riccieri, Doctor Hortensia Gutiérrez Posse, General Ricardo Echeberry Boneo, Ambassador Carlos Ortiz de Rozas, Cardinal Antonio Samoré, Pope John Paul II, Monsignor Gabriel Montalero, Ambassador Enrique Berstein, Subsecretary Ernesto Videla, Julio Philippi, Ambassador Santiago Benadava, Helmut Brunner, Minister Counsellor Patricio Pozo, Patricio Prieto, Osvaldo Muñoz, Counsellor Fernándo Perez and Secretary Maximiliano Jarpa

List of members of the Chilean Delegation in Rome:

- Enrique Bernstein
- Francisco Orrego
- Julio Philippi
- Ernesto Videla
- Santiago Benadava
- Helmut Brunner
- Patricio Prieto
- Osvaldo Muñoz
- Fernando Pérez Egert
- Maximiliano Jarpa

List of members of the Argentine Delegation in Rome:

- General (R) Ricardo Echeverry Boneo
- Marcelo Depech
- Guillermo Moncayo
- Carlos Ortiz de Rozas
- Guillermo Moncayo
- Hugo Gobbi
- Susana Ruiz

Cardinal Antonio Samorè's principal assistant was the Spanish priest Monsignor Faustino Sainz Muñoz.

== The four phases of the mediation ==
Mark Laudy sees four phases during the mediation:

- The first phase was the shortest and most critical period of the entire mediation and began with Samorè's arrival in Buenos Aires on 25 December 1978. This was purely a crisis intervention to prevent a war and secure an agreement to submit the matter to mediation. In a shuttle diplomacy, Samorè flew between Santiago de Chile and Buenos Aires until the objectives were achieved with the signing of the Act of Montevideo on 8 January 1979.
- The second period ran from May 1979, when the Chilean and Argentine delegations arrived in Rome, through December 1980, when the Pope presented the parties with his proposal for settling the dispute. This first proposal was rejected by Argentina.
- The third and longest phase, running from the beginning of 1981 until December 1983, after Argentina's return to democracy, was characterized by long periods of stalled negotiations. The most significant developments during this period were the Argentine repudiation of the 1972 General Treaty; the subsequent effort to fill the juridical vacuum resulting from that repudiation; and the Falklands War, which set the stage for the return to democracy in Argentina.
- The final phase began when Raúl Alfonsín assumed the presidency in Buenos Aires at the end of 1983 and ended with the signing of the 1984 Treaty of Peace and Friendship.

== The papal proposal of 1980 ==
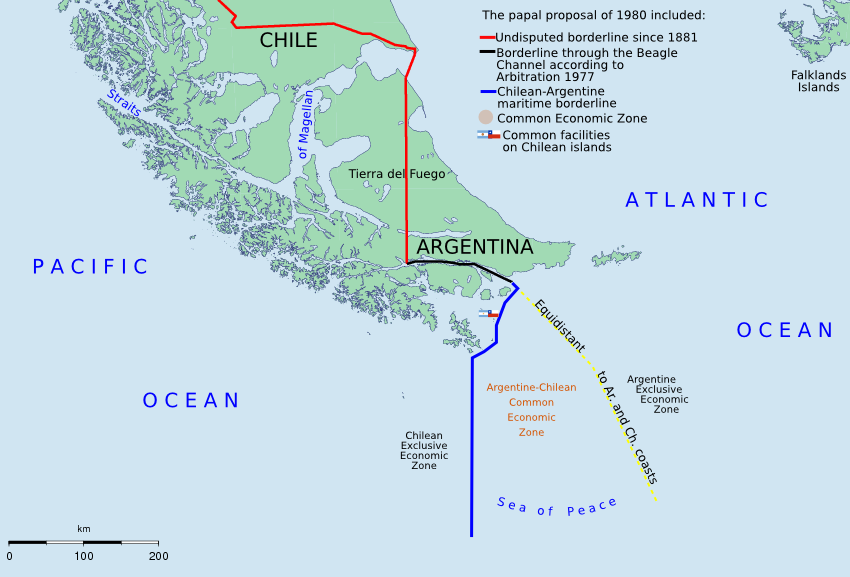
The papal proposal of 1980.

On 12 December 1980, the Pope received both delegations and communicated to them his proposal for resolving the controversy, the terms of which had been developed entirely in secret and should be kept secret in order to avoid debilitating public debate that might diminish confidence in the proceedings and limit the freedom of action of both governments. But on 22 August 1981 the Argentine newspaper La Nación published the terms of the proposal. Chile would retain all of the islands and Argentina would be entitled to maintain certain limited facilities (common radar and weather stations) on some islands and would receive important navigation rights. Most important, however, was the creation of an ocean area known as the Sea of Peace. In this area, extending to the east and southeast from the disputed chain of islands, Chilean territorial waters would be limited to a narrow territorial sea, in which it would be obliged to share with Argentina equal participation in resource exploitation, scientific investigation, and environmental management. Beyond the Chilean territorial waters would be a much broader band of ocean subject to Argentine jurisdiction, but also subject to the same sharing provisions that applied in Chilean waters.

Chile accepted the papal proposal, despite some reservations. Argentina never formally replied to the proposal. However, on 17 March 1981, Argentina delivered a note to the Vatican expressing grave misgivings about the proposal, both because it failed to award any islands to Argentina and because it allowed Chile to maintain a presence so far into the Atlantic.

== Argentina renounced a 1972 Arbitration treaty ==
On 21 January 1982, Argentina announced the withdrawal from the 1972 bilateral treaty providing for recourse to the International Court of Justice in case of disputes. In Argentina, the judicial process had become an anathema, particularly in view of the adverse 1977 arbitration award. Chile reserved the right to go to the ICJ unilaterally before the treaty ended on 27 December 1982.

== To the Falklands War ==
After the papal proposal, negotiations remained stalled and meanwhile, a sequence of incidents in Chile and Argentina strained relations between the two countries.

On 28 April 1981, General Leopoldo Fortunato Galtieri (then Argentine army chief; later, during the Falklands War, President of Argentina) closed the border to Chile without any consultation with his own president.

In March 1982, five weeks before the beginning of the Falklands War, a ship of the Argentine navy, ARA Francisco de Gurruchaga, anchored at the Deceit island, de facto under Chilean sovereignty since 1881, and refused to abandon the bay, despite Chilean demands.

On 2 April 1982, Argentina invaded the Falkland Islands. The Argentine plan included indeed the military occupation of the disputed islands at the Beagle channel after the invasion of the Falklands, as stated by Brigadier Basilio Lami Dozo, chief of the Argentine Air Force during the Falklands War, in an interview with the Argentine magazine Perfil: L.F. Galtieri: "[Chile] have to know that what we are doing now, because they will be the next in turn." Óscar Camilión, Minister for Foreign Affairs of Argentina from 29 March 1981 to 11 December 1981, in his "Memorias Políticas", confirms the plan of the Argentine military: "The military planning was, with the Falklands in Argentine hands, to invade the disputed islands in the Beagle Channel. That was the determination of the [Argentine] navy…". Pope John Paul II made an unscheduled visit to Buenos Aires on 14 June 1982, in an attempt to prevent further hostilities between Britain and Argentina.

Chile became the only major Latin American country to support Britain indirectly by providing a military and naval diversion, but "in private many [Latin American] governments were pleased with the outcome of the war".

== The final phase ==
After the war, despite the renewal of the 1972 Treaty on 15 September 1982, the distension after ARA-Gurruchaga incident and the spy-exchanging, the mediation continued to move very slowly. Following the war Chile evinced a greater willingness to negotiate modifications to the papal proposal, but by then it had become clear that the Argentine junta, reeling from its defeat in the war, was too weak to achieve an agreement.

Cardinal Antonio Samorè died in Rome at age 77, in February 1983.

President Raúl Alfonsín's new government was firmly committed to resolve the conflict as quickly as possible. Based on this commitment and additional discussions, the parties were able to lay much of the groundwork for a settlement.

In April 1984, Vatican Secretary of State Agostino Casaroli asked separately the two delegations for their proposals for a final solution.

By October 1984, both countries reached a complete understanding, and the revised text of the treaty was finalized on 18 October.

Chile accepted, again, the papal proposal. In Argentina, Alfonsin held a consultative referendum. The official returns showed 10,391,019 voted in favor of the proposed treaty while 2,105,663 opposed it, a margin of 82 percent to 16 percent opposed, with 2 percent casting blank or null ballots.

The Treaty of Peace and Friendship of 1984 between Chile and Argentina went a long way before enacted:

- on 30 December 1984, the treaty passed the Argentine Chamber of Deputies;
- on 15 March 1985, the treaty passed the Argentine Senate;
- on 16 March 1985, the treaty was signed by representative of the President of Argentina, who was abroad;
- on 11 April 1985, the treaty passed the Chilean junta;
- on 12 April 1985, the treaty was signed by Augusto Pinochet;
- on 2 May 1985, both ministers exchanged instruments.

== Aftermath ==
The Cardenal Antonio Samoré Pass crossing border was renamed to honor the special representative of Pope John Paul II. The 1984 treaty concluded the Beagle conflict. Chile received recognition as sovereign of Picton, Lennox and Nueva, Argentina kept most Atlantic maritime rights, and both states still treat the 1881 and 1984 treaties as final. In a show of good faith, navies of both countries now hold joint drills in the waters of the Beagle Channel, the name of the drill is Viekaren, meaning “trust”.

== See also ==
- Pope John Paul II
- Foreign relations of the Holy see
- Papal arbitration
- Antonio Samoré
- Falklands War
- Argentina-Chile relations
