= Papal arbitration =

Papal Arbitration was a form of international arbitration used between warring Catholic states where the Pope tried to mediate and bring both sides to an acceptable solution. The Papacy used various techniques to engage in dispute resolution amongst the states.

Identifying itself as the custodian of the Christian theology, the Catholic church functioned as an arbitrator among Christian states, specifically during the Middle Ages. However, the Pope's role as an arbitrator brought him into conflict with the various Christian sovereigns across Europe. After Renaissance, the power of the Pope to serve as an effective arbitrator was questioned, despite brief efforts to restore the same. While the Pope was still part of discussions in the 17th century CE, the effectiveness of Pope's arbitration declined. In the 19th and 20th centuries, the Pope had intervened in certain conflicts, serving as a moral rather than legitimate authority in resolving these.

== Description ==
Papal Arbitration was a form of international arbitration, where the Pope intervened and tried to mediate between warring Catholic states to bring about an acceptable solution. This was based on the notion that the Catholic Church served as the guardian of the Christian theology. The Popes used various methods and techniques such as crusades, inquisitions and excommunications, to intervene in such cases and helped establish political domination over the states.

== History ==
In the Middle Ages, the Gregorian Reform sought to establish Pope as the supreme leader of Christianity in the eleventh century CE. Apart from being a spiritual leader, the Pope became an authority over the various Christian sovereigns, and sought to arbitrate in the proceedings of various states. In the 13th century CE, the Pope's powers intertwined with the politics of various states. The real powers depended on the individual Pope's capability to negotiate and arbitrate in matters of states. Towards the 15th century CE, the Pope sought to engage in more diplomatic methods to resolve political conflicts.

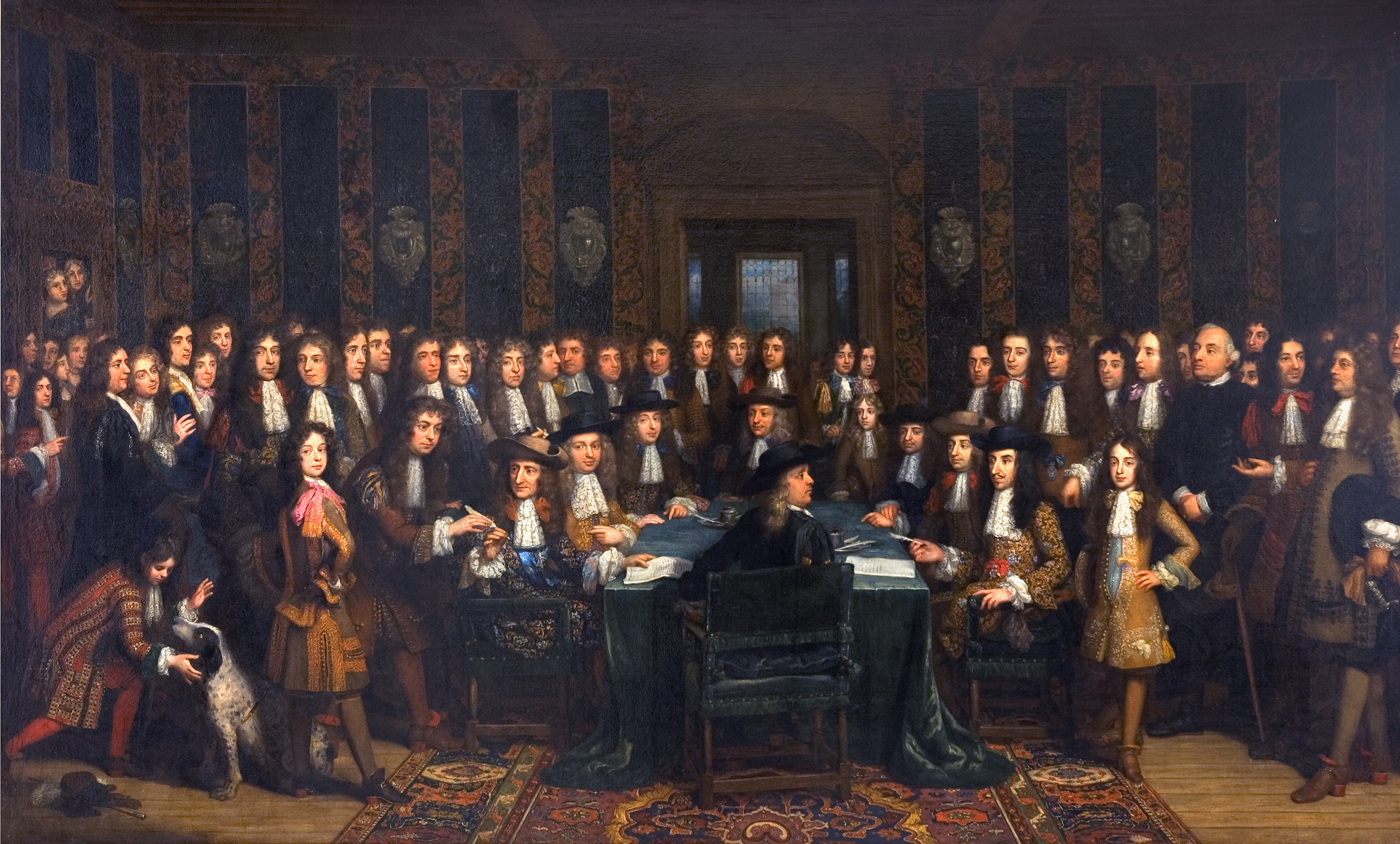
The Pope played a role in the signing of Treaties of Nijmegen (1678)

The Pope's role as an arbitrator brought him into conflict with the various Christian sovereigns across Europe. After Renaissance, the power of the Pope to serve as an effective arbitrator was questioned, despite brief efforts to restore the same. While the Pope was still part of discussions in the 17th century CE, the effectiveness of Pope's arbitration declined. The Pope played a part in signing of the Peace of Westphalia (1648) and Treaties of Nijmegen (1678). However, the Church experienced subsequent failures and did not have a significant influence during the Peace of Utrecht (1713) and conflict with Louis XV (1725). The sovereigns accepted the Pope's mandates only as long as it served their own interests.

With changing political landscapes, the Pope sought to re-establish the role of Papacy as a neutral international arbitrator in the 18th century as a moral power rather than a legal authority. The Pope successfully intervened in the Carolines Question between the German Empire and the Kingdom of Spain in 1885. In the late 19th and 20th centuries, the Pope intervened in more conflicts, such as in Venezuelan crisis of 1895 and First Italo-Ethiopian War (1896). The Lateran Treaty resulted in the establishment of Vatican City as a sovereign state, which gave legitimate authority to the Pope as a head of state.

During the Cold War, the Pope intervened in the tension between the East and the West, and voiced out to de-escalate tensions during the Cuban Missile Crisis (1962). The Pope also mediated between Argentina and Chile during the Beagle conflict in 1978. The Pope played a role in the resumption of diplomatic relations between the United States and Cuba in the 21st century. In the 21st century, the Papacy had positioned itself as a moral authority, and influences Christians across various domains.
