= Léonard Thiry =

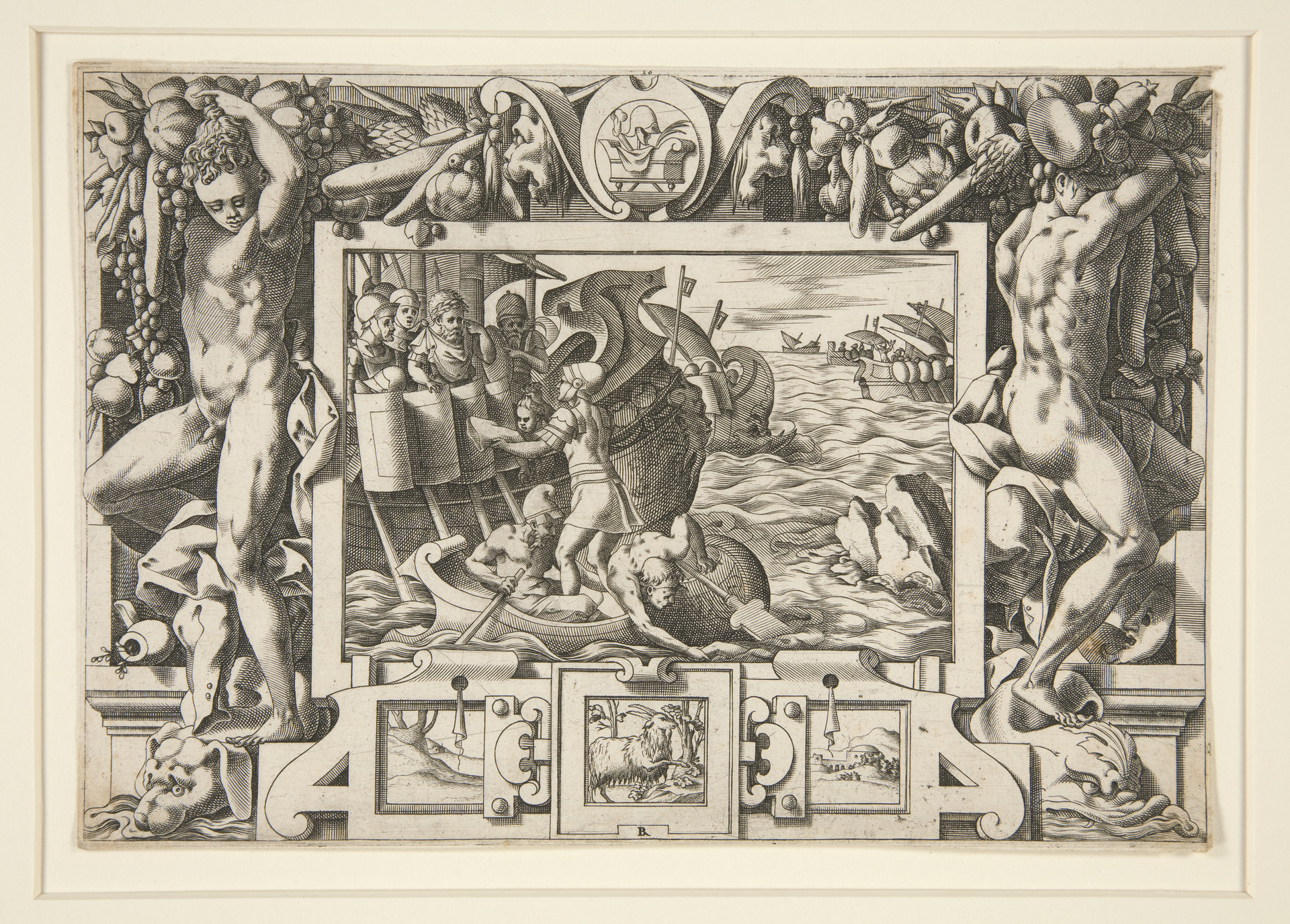
Aeetes Accepts the Dismembered Corpse of Absyrte, a School of Fontainebleau surround, print by René Boyvin after Thiry

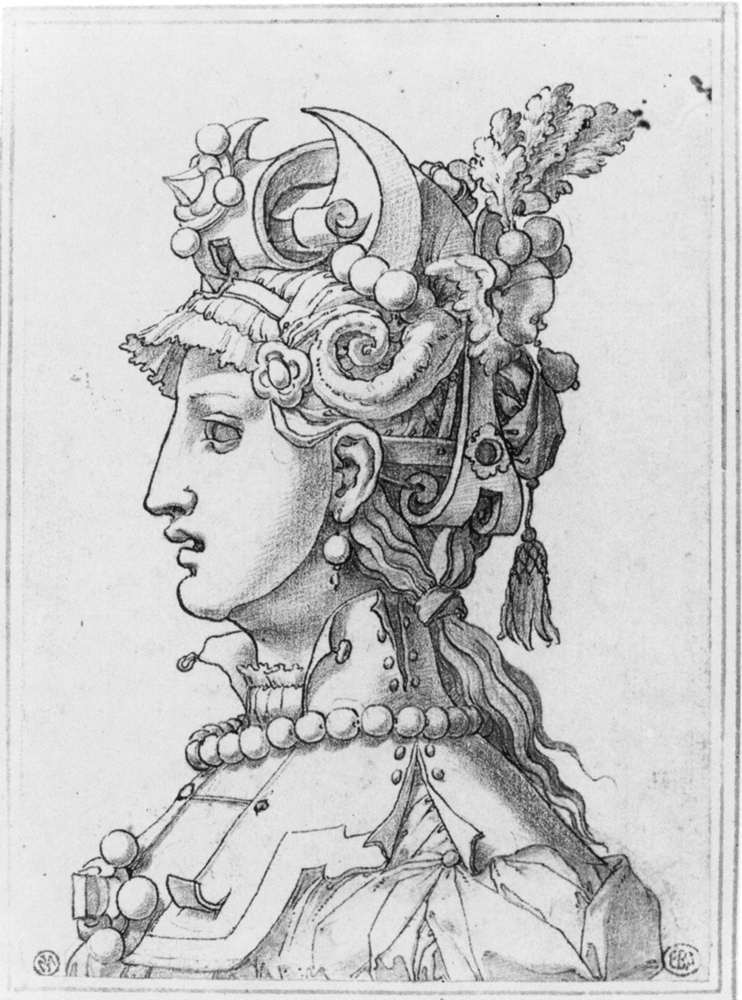
Design for a woman's mask

Léonard Thiry (active 1530 – 1550), was a Flemish Renaissance painter and printmaker. He is considered a member of the First School of Fontainebleau, working as an assistant to Rosso Fiorentino and continuing under Francesco Primaticcio, but none of his individual contributions can now be identified. His designs were reproduced as prints by Léon Davent, René Boyvin and others, although he does not seem to have worked any plates himself. He is credited with some drawings.

For a long time he was credited by many with the prints signed "L.D." (supposedly standing for "Léonard [de] Deventer"), which are now recognised as by Léon Davent.

== Biography ==
He was born in Deventer but was trained in Antwerp as an engraver and painter who worked in Paris with the master of the Médaillons Historiques. He is registered in Rome in 1530, in Antwerp in 1533, and in Fontainebleau from 1535 onwards. He died in Antwerp.
