= Luca Penni =

Italian painter (c.1500/04–1556)

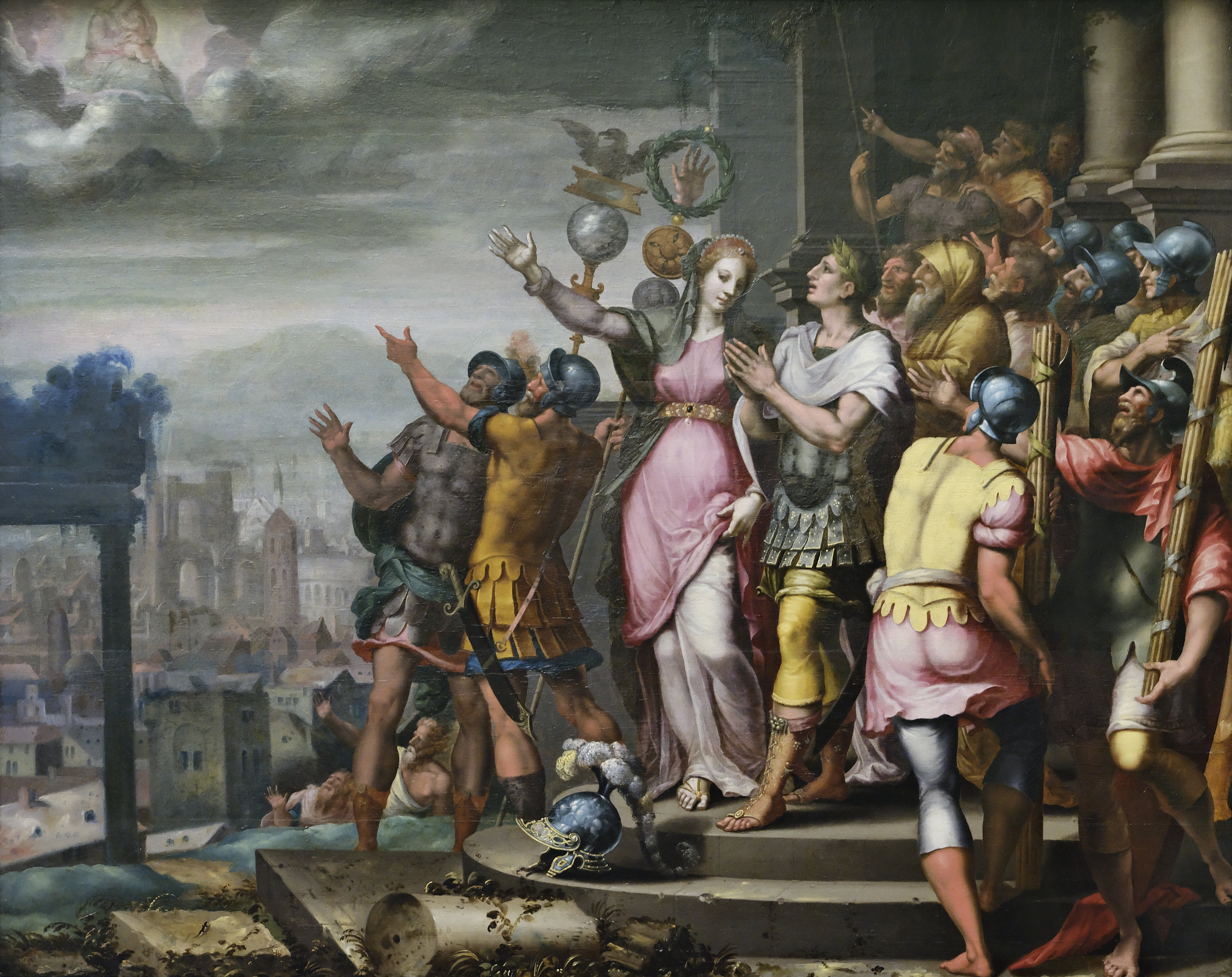
Augustus and the Sibyl from Tibur

Luca Penni (c.1500/1504–1556) was an Italian painter of the 16th century, best known for his work in France as part of the First School of Fontainebleau. He was nicknamed Le Romain (the Roman).

== Life ==
Penni was born in Florence, into a family of weavers. His brothers Gianfrancesco and Bartolommeo were also painters. He seems to have trained under Raphael in Florence and Rome. In the late 1520s, Penni worked with his brother-in-law Perino del Vaga in Genoa, settling into his own style before his stay at Fontainebleau.

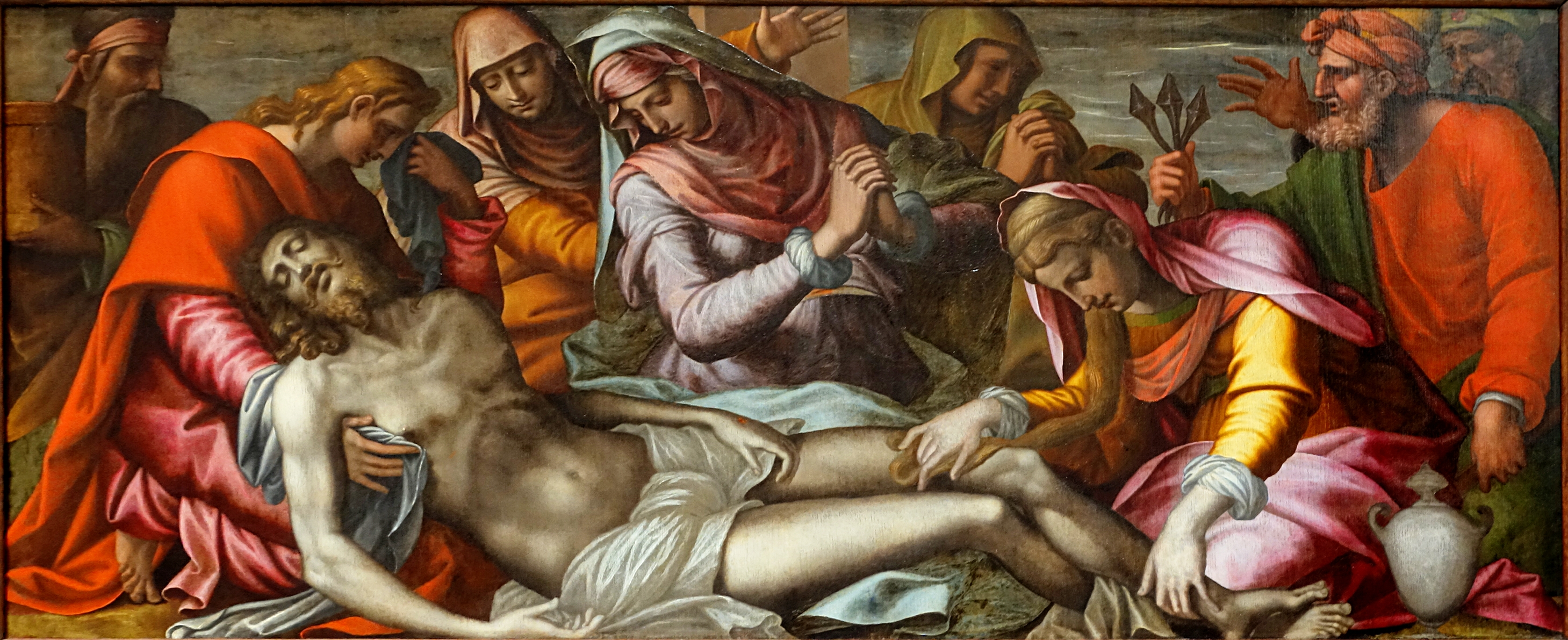
The Deposition

Luca Penni, Rosso Fiorentino and Francesco Primaticcio were summoned by Francis I of France to France. They gave his Palace of Fontainebleau a daring, delicate and sophisticated Italian Renaissance style. Penni formed part of Primaticcio's team decorating the pavillon des Poêles and the galerie d’Ulysse and also drew cartoons for tapestries – he is cited in French royal accounts between 1537 and 1540 as one of the French court's top artists.

Meanwhile Gianfrancesco stayed in Rome and became a leading assistant to Raphael, while Bartolommeo moved to work on Nonsuch Palace for Henry VIII of England, and stayed as one of the foreign artists of the Tudor court.

In about 1546 Luca may have left France in the company of Léon Davent, as a number of Davent's prints dated 1546 or 1547 are based on designs by Penni, and printed on paper from Germany (as it then was). Davent made many etchings of designs by Penni, through the 1540s and early 1550s.

After Francis's death, in 1547, Penni moved to rue de la Cerisaie in Paris and continued working with printmakers, continuing his Fontainebleau style in works for new aristocratic and middle-class clients. He also publicised his style via engravings of his secular, religious and mythological works by Jean Mignon and Léon Davent – René Boyvin also engraved Penni's oil portrait of Henry II of France, though Penni's original painting for The Resurrection of Lazarus (engraved by Nicolas Houël in 1555) is now lost. Penni died in Paris.

== Work ==
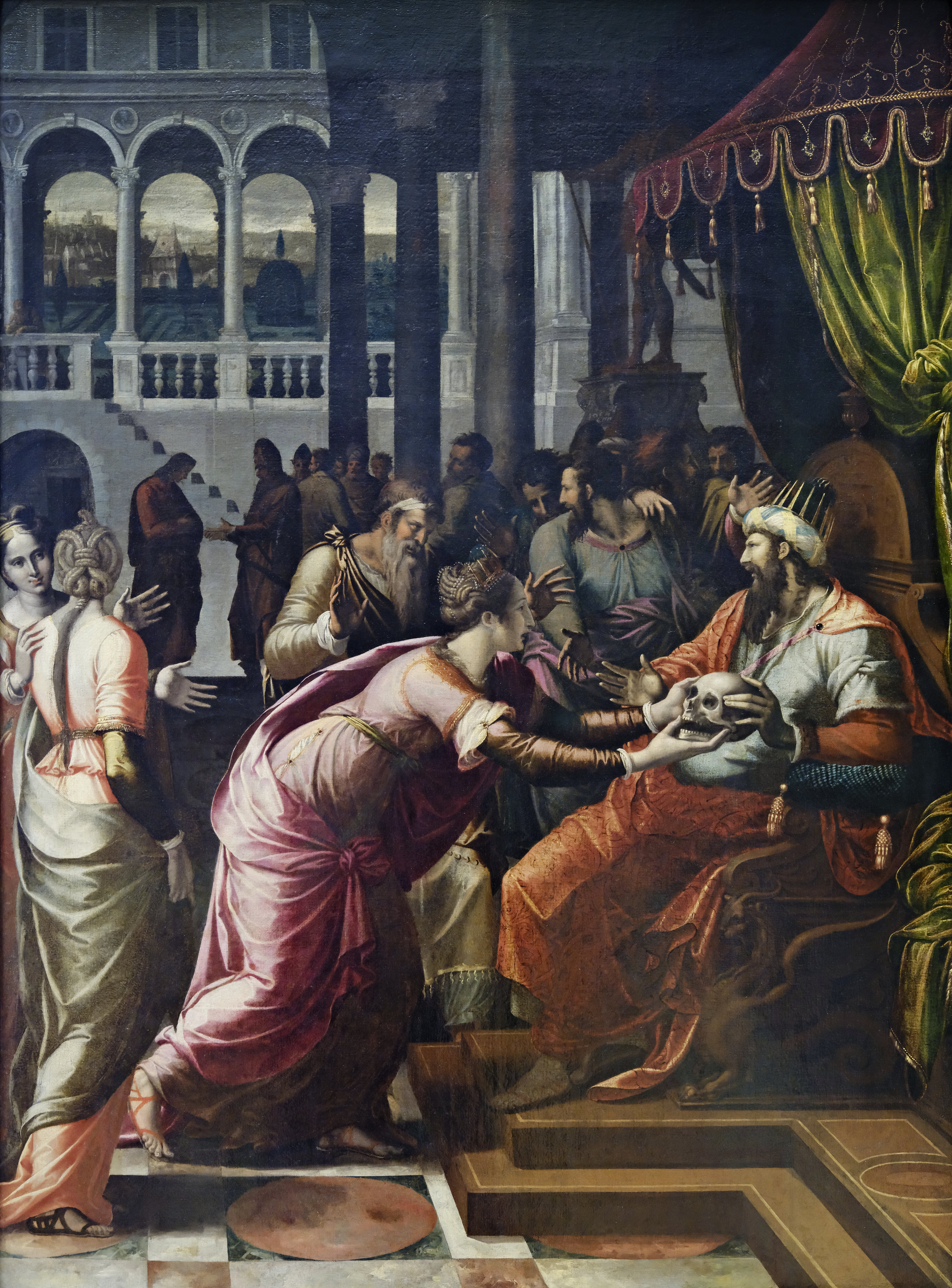
The Judgment of Otto

Penni's work has its roots in the legacy of Raphael and the esthetic of Fontainebleau. While his compositions often found their origins in Raphael's work, the lines are pure and simple. This was a legacy of the years he spent in Fontainebleau executing projects alongside Rosso and Primaticcio. The evolution of his style paradoxically made him the inventor of French classicism derived from Italian mannerism.

== Selected works ==
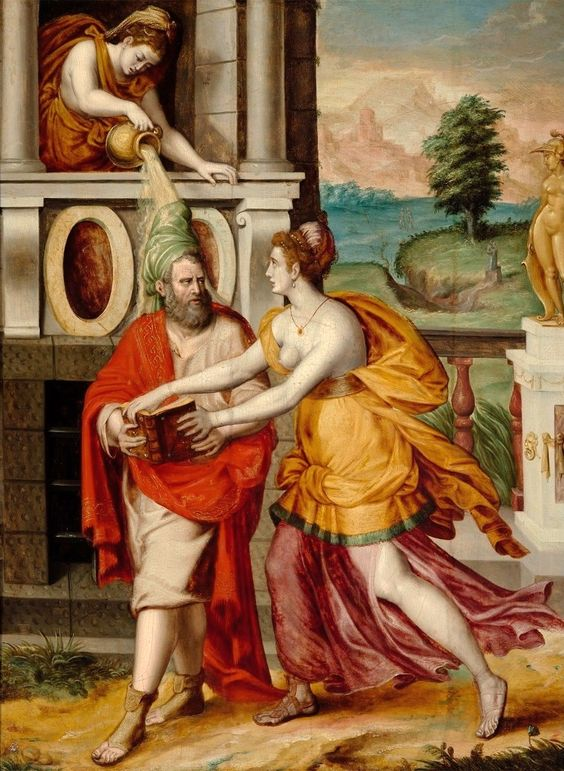
Socrates and Xanthippe

- Battle of the Tupinamba, pen and black ink, brown and beige wash, retints in white gouache on beige wash paper, 29 x 46.5 cm, Musée du Louvre, Paris.
- Mars assisting Venus in her toilette, pen and brown ink, grey and beige wash, traces of black chalk, retints in white gouache, traces of pen marks, on beige wash paper, 33.4 x 45.5 cm, Musée du Louvre.
- Queen before a king holding a skull, oil on wood, later transferred to canvas huile, 102 x 74 cm, Musée du Louvre.
- Augustus and the Tiburtine Sibyl, c. 1550, huile sur bois, 85 x 103 cm, Musée du Louvre, Paris (acquired 2012 whilst attributed to Second Fontainebleau School, later identified as a work by Luca Penni).
- Lamentation of Christ, oil on wood, 59 x 140 cm, Palais des beaux-arts de Lille.
- Socrates and Xanthippe oil on oak wood, 77.5x60 cm, The Royal Castle in Warsaw
- Jesus Bearing the Cross, pen and black ink, beige wash, retints in white gouache, traces of stylus and black chalk, part of an editing line in black chalk along the right side, beige wash paper, Paris, Musée du Louvre, département des Arts graphiques,
- Aeneas and the golden bough, pen and black ink, brown-beige wash, retints in white (oxidised), squared in black chalk, Paris, Bibliothèque nationale de France, département des Estampes et de la Photographie, réserve, B 5 fol. XLIV.
- The Trojans washing the frozen body of Misenus and preparing his funeral pyre, pen and brown ink, beige wash, white gouache retints, beige wash paper, squared in black chalk, Paris, Musée du Louvre, département des Arts graphiques, inv. 1404.
- The Conversion of Saint Paul, pen and brown ink, brown wash, traces of stylus, retints in white gouache, beige washed paper, Paris, Musée du Louvre, département des Arts graphiques, inv. 1402.
- Male nudes fighting in front of a burning pyre, pen and brown ink, beige and brown wash, retints in white gouache, traces of stylus, beige wash paper, Paris, Musée du Louvre, département des Arts graphiques, inv. 1400.
- David beheading Goliath, pen and brown ink, beige wash, on preparatory tracing in black chalk, retints in white gouache, on two joined pieces of beige wash paper, Paris, Musée du Louvre, département des Arts graphiques, inv. 8717.
- The Judgement of Paris, pen and brown ink, brown wash, retints in white gouache, traces of stylus, beige wash paper, Paris, Musée du Louvre, département des Arts graphiques, inv. 1395.
- Cassandra stopping Deiphobus from killing Paris, victor of the funerary games organised in his memory, two drawings in pen and brown ink, beige wash, retints in white gouache, beige wash paper, Paris, Musée du Louvre, département des Arts graphiques, inv. 1397 and 1398.
- Battle in the palace of Priam, pen and brown ink, retints in white gouache, traces of stylus, brown wash paper, Paris, Musée du Louvre, département des Arts graphiques, inv. 8794.
- The Trojan Horse being brought into Troy, pen and brown ink, beige wash, retints in white gouache, traces of stylus, beige wash paper, Paris, Musée du Louvre, département des Arts graphiques, inv. 1399.
- Pietà, pen and brown ink, beige wash, on beige wash paper, Paris, private collection.
- Alcinous receiving Ulysses, pen and brown ink, brown wash, retints in white gouache, preparatory tracing in black chalk, beige paper, Paris, École nationale supérieure des beaux-arts, Mas. 1384.
- Banqueting scene, pen and brown ink, beige wash, beige washed paper, Paris, Musée du Louvre, département des Arts graphiques, inv. 26369.
- Polyphemus in love with Galatea, pen and brown ink, beige wash, brown wash, preparatory tracings in black chalk, retints in white gouache, on beige washed paper, Paris, Musée du Louvre, département des Arts graphiques, inv. 8758.
- Mars assisting Venus in her toilette, pen and brown ink, grey and beige wash, traces of black chalk, retints in white gouache, traces of stylus, beige wash paper, Paris, Musée du Louvre, département des Arts graphiques, inv. 1396.
- Venus embracing Cupid, oil on wood, later transferred to canvas, H. 1,22; L. 0,96 m, Bourges, Musée du Berry, inv. 840-4-1.
- Jupiter and Semele, pen and brown ink, brown wash, retints in white gouache (partly oxidised), pink ('sanguine' or 'minium') wash paper, Paris, Musée du Louvre, département des Arts graphiques, RF 3939.
- Venus asking Cupid to strike Pluto, pen and brown ink, beige wash, brown wash, retints in white gouache, beige wash paper, Paris, Musée du Louvre, département des Arts graphiques, inv. 1407.
- Renown driving a quadriga, in which are seated Victory and Abundance, design for the reverse of a medal issued by Henry II of France, pen and brown ink, brown wash, retints in white gouache, preparatory tracings in black chalk, Paris, École nationale supérieure des beaux-arts, Mas. 900.
- A queen before a king, holding a skull, pen and brown ink, beige wash, preparatory tracings in stylus and black chalk, Paris, Musée du Louvre, département des Arts graphiques, RF 41214.
- The Holy Women at the Tomb, pen and brown ink, brown wash, retints in white gouache, on beige wash paper, H. 30,3; L. 45,9 cm, Paris, musée du Louvre, département des Arts graphiques, inv. 1394.

== Bibliography ==
- (in French) Dominique Cordellier, Luca Penni. Un disciple de Raphaël à Fontainebleau, Paris, Musée du Louvre/Somogy Éditions d’Art, 2012, 208 pages ISBN 978-2-7572-0583-9
- Jacobson, Karen (ed), (often wrongly cat. as Georg Baselitz), The French Renaissance in Prints, 1994, Grunwald Center, UCLA, ISBN 0962816221
