= Timoclea =

Theban woman (4th century BC)

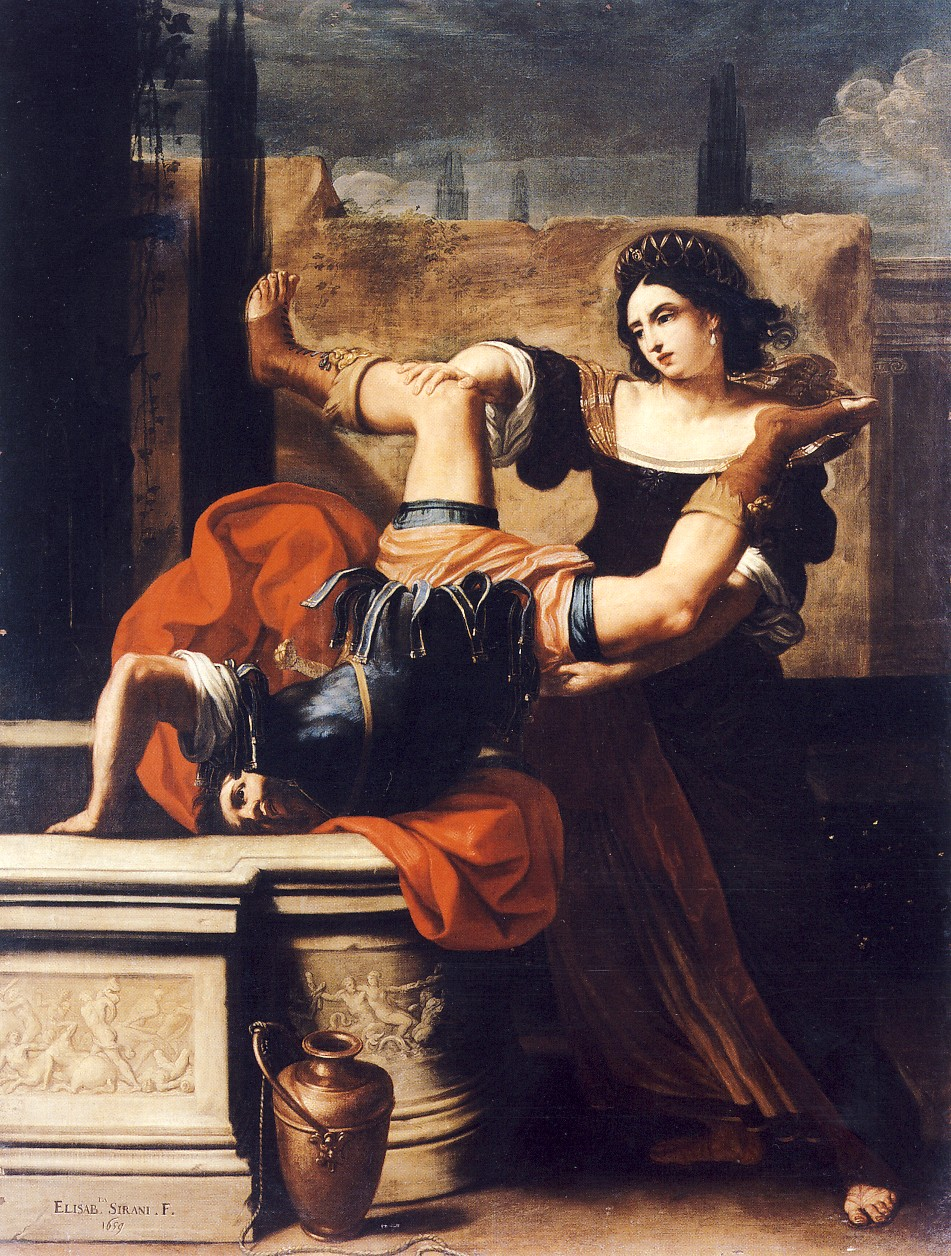
1659 painting by Elisabetta Sirani (adapting Merian's engraving); Timoclea pushing the Thracian captain who raped her into a well.

Timoclea or Timocleia of Thebes (Ancient Greek: Τιμοκλεία) is a woman whose story is told by Plutarch in his Life of Alexander, and at greater length in his Mulierum virtutes ("Virtues of Women"). According to Plutarch's biography of Alexander the Great, when his forces took Thebes during Alexander's Balkan campaign of 335 BC, Thracian forces pillaged the city, and a Thracian captain raped Timocleia. After raping her, the captain asked if she knew of any hidden money. She told him that she did, and led him into her garden, and told him there was money hidden in her well. When the Thracian captain stooped to look into the well, Timocleia pushed him down into it, and then hurled heavy stones down until the captain died.

She was then seized by the Thracian soldiers and brought before Alexander. She comported herself with great dignity and told him that her brother was Theagenes, the last commander of the Sacred Band of Thebes, who died "for the liberty of Greece" at the Battle of Chaeronea in 338 BC, defeated by Alexander's father Philip of Macedon. Alexander, filled with admiration for her courage over her "daring deed" ordered that she and her children be released without punishment for killing the Thracian captain, as he had judged that justice had already been served.

The story in the Mulierum virtutes is essentially the same, except that the captain is told that the treasure, of silver bowls, gold and some money, was at the bottom of a dry well, which he climbs down into. When Timoclea hears that he has reached the bottom, she throws down rocks on him. Alexander dismisses her without punishment but does not set her or her family free. He instead tells his officers to take special care of them and other renowned families, making sure there is no more abuse.

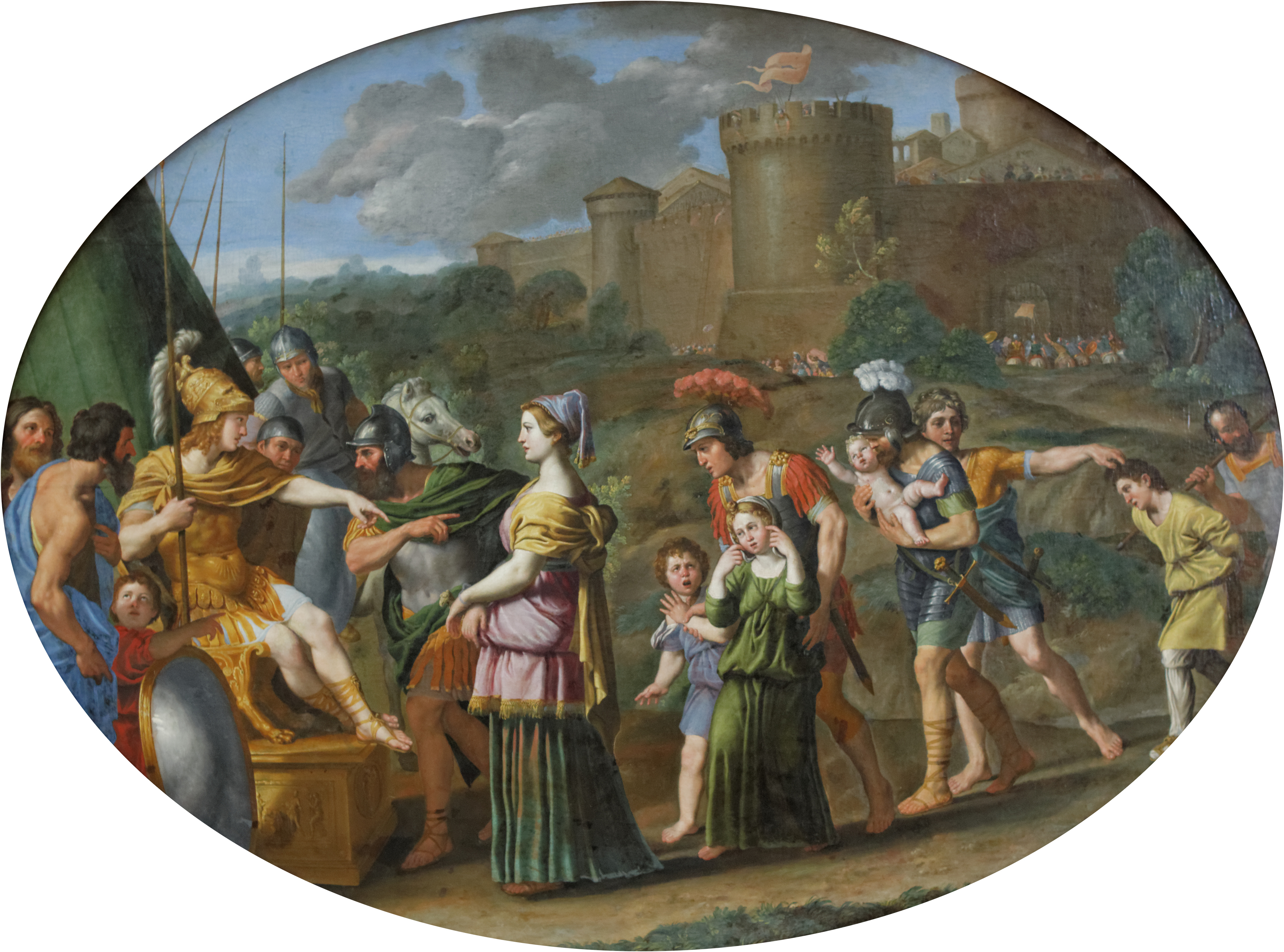
Timoclea before Alexander the Great, painting by Domenichino, c. 1615, Louvre.

Plutarch's main source for the incident, as he mentions in passing elsewhere, was the account by Aristobulus of Cassandreia, who knew Alexander well; this survives only in quotations by others, which may not all be accurate. The taking of Thebes took place in the second year of Alexander's reign, and was otherwise a very bloody affair, as the city was the leader in a Greek revolt, taking advantage of Philip's assassination, against the treaties he had enforced. Perhaps 6,000 Thebans died, and 30,000 were enslaved, and the city virtually ceased to exist for some decades. The only other act of clemency recorded is that Alexander ordered the house and descendants of the poet Pindar (died c. 443 BC) to be left alone.

== In later art ==
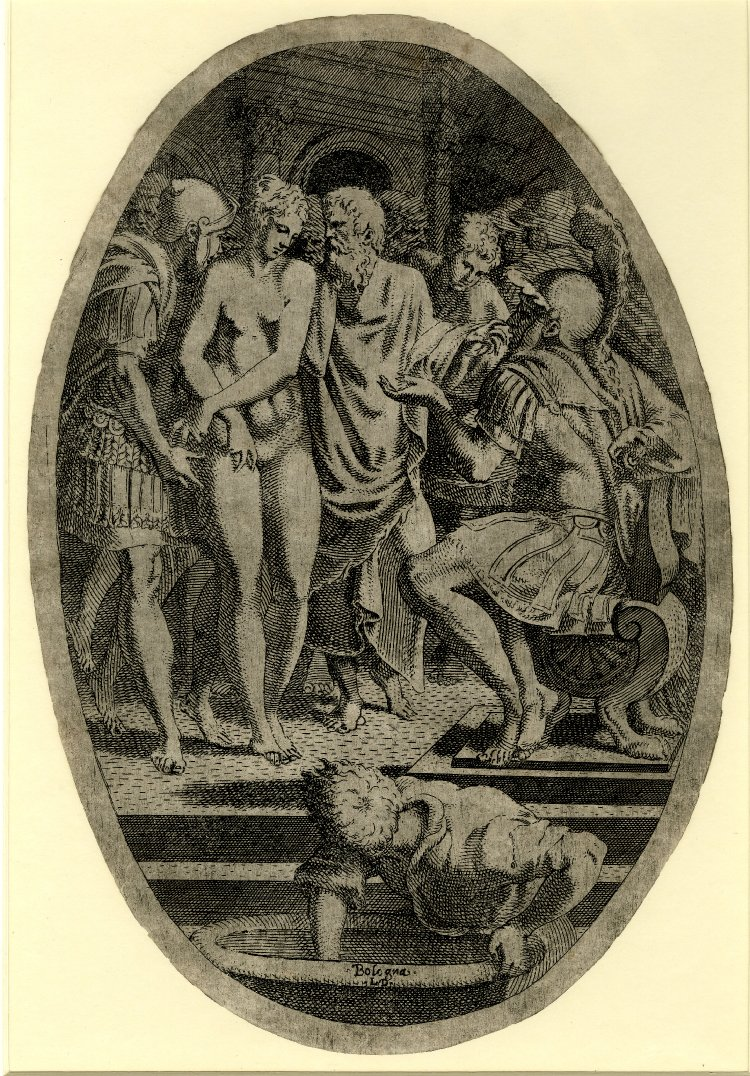
Léon Davent, Etching, c.1541/45, after Francesco Primaticcio. 341 x 231 mm.

Timoclea was a rare subject in art from the Renaissance onwards, never becoming a regular subject in the range of incidents showing classical and biblical female violence against men known as the Power of Women topos. But she featured in cycles on the Life of Alexander, and there was an increasing tendency in court art to depict Alexander as a proxy for the actual monarch, and to emphasize acts of generosity or mercy.

Most depictions show her brought before Alexander, which might form part of a cycle illustrating his life. This was the case in the cycle of frescos painted in the Palace of Fontainebleau in the 1540s by Francesco Primaticcio and his team. This was in the bedroom of Francois I's mistress, the Duchess of Étampes (1508–1580), and a total of eleven compositions surviving today are known from surviving paintings or prints or drawings. The cycle showed the life of Alexander, but with little emphasis on his military career. This was one of the three subjects from the cycle etched as a print by Léon Davent. Unusually in this subject, but rather typically for the First School of Fontainebleau, Timoclea is naked when brought to Alexander.

Here and in other depictions, the subject was given a composition similar to ones of the much more common The Continence of Scipio; the subject likewise emphasized the magnanimity of the commander. Timoclea sometimes accompanied the Continence in a series, and is also capable of being confused with it. Bernard de Montfaucon paired the two stories as his "Examples of the clemency and continence of conquerors" in a book of 1724.

As the Life of Alexander was a popular subject, the story of Timoclea probably would have been more a popular element if there had not been a grander and less sordid competitor in the form of The Family of Darius before Alexander, best known from Veronese's painting in London, which was normally included in cycles, and also showed Alexander being generous to women captives brought before him.

The most influential image of Timoclea's story, judging by copies in prints for two centuries after, was the painting by Domenichino of c. 1615, which was in the French royal collection from the time of Louis XIV, and then the Louvre. Unlike most depictions, this shows her children prominently. A very different composition, showing only one and a half figures, with the Thracian disappearing upside down into the well, first appears in an engraving of 1629–30 by Matthäus Merian, a book illustration for a popular German world history by Johann Ludwig Gottfried. This was later adapted in an oil painting by Elisabetta Sirani.

== Later literature ==
A play, now lost, called Timoclea at the Siege of Thebes was performed at Hampton Court Palace before Elizabeth I and the English court at Candlemas 1574, on February 2 (this was five years before the influential English translation of Plutarch by Thomas North was published). The author is unknown, and the performers were boys from the Merchant Taylor's School, London, directed by their master Richard Mulcaster. They were one of a number of companies of boy players active in English Renaissance theatre in London. The performance and its expenses was recorded in the accounts of the Master of the Revels, and from the number of children's gloves paid for may have included twenty four performers. It may not have been a great success, as the masque prepared to follow it, with ladies "with lightes being vj vertues" was "not showen for the Tediusnesse of the playe that nighte."

Timoclea also appears in Gynaikeion or Nine Books of Various History Concerning Women by Thomas Heywood, 1624, and as a minor character in John Lyly's play Campaspe, a comedy also performed by boy players. According to this, Timoclea and Campaspe were both captives at Alexander's conquest of Thebes, and are brought together before Alexander, where Timoclea's aristocratic dignity contrasts with Campaspe's self-description as "a humble handmaid to Alexander". Campaspe was later the mistress of Alexander and his painter Apelles, and is a common story depicted in Alexander's life in art.

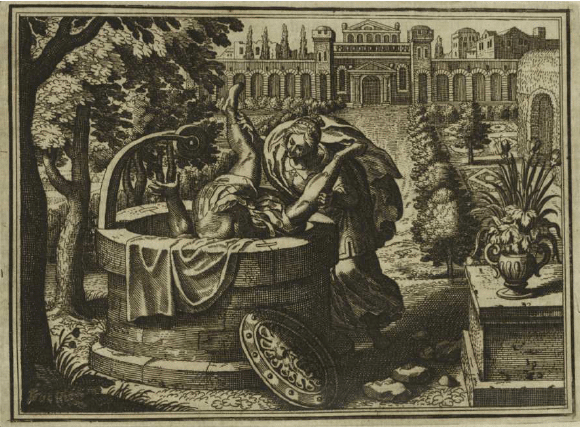
The engraving of 1629–30 by Matthäus Merian, a book illustration.

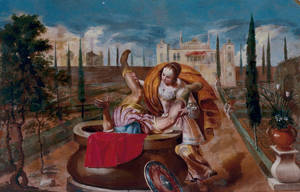
Another adaptation of Merian's print, in a grand Baroque scheme in the Eggenberg Palace, Graz

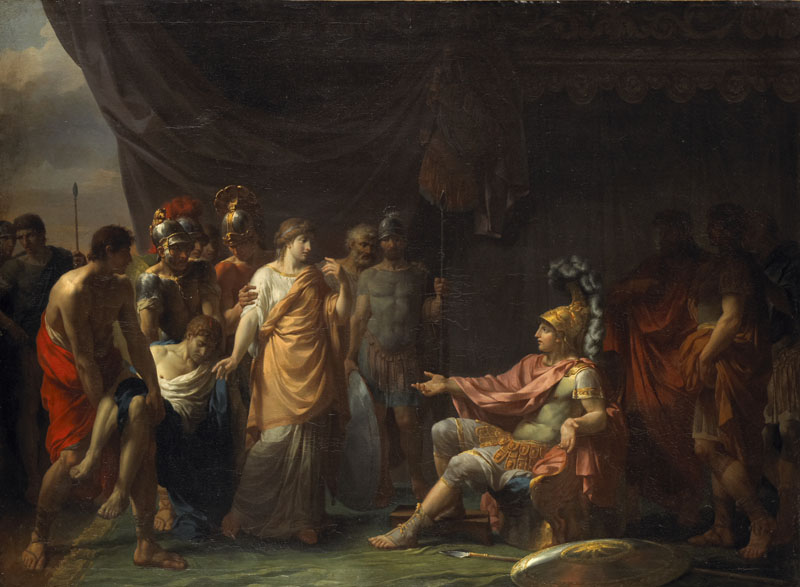
A Neoclassical treatment by Jean-Charles Nicaise Perrin, 1782. The dead captain has been brought along as evidence.
