= René Boyvin =

French engraver

René Boyvin (1525–1598) was a French engraver who lived in Angers.

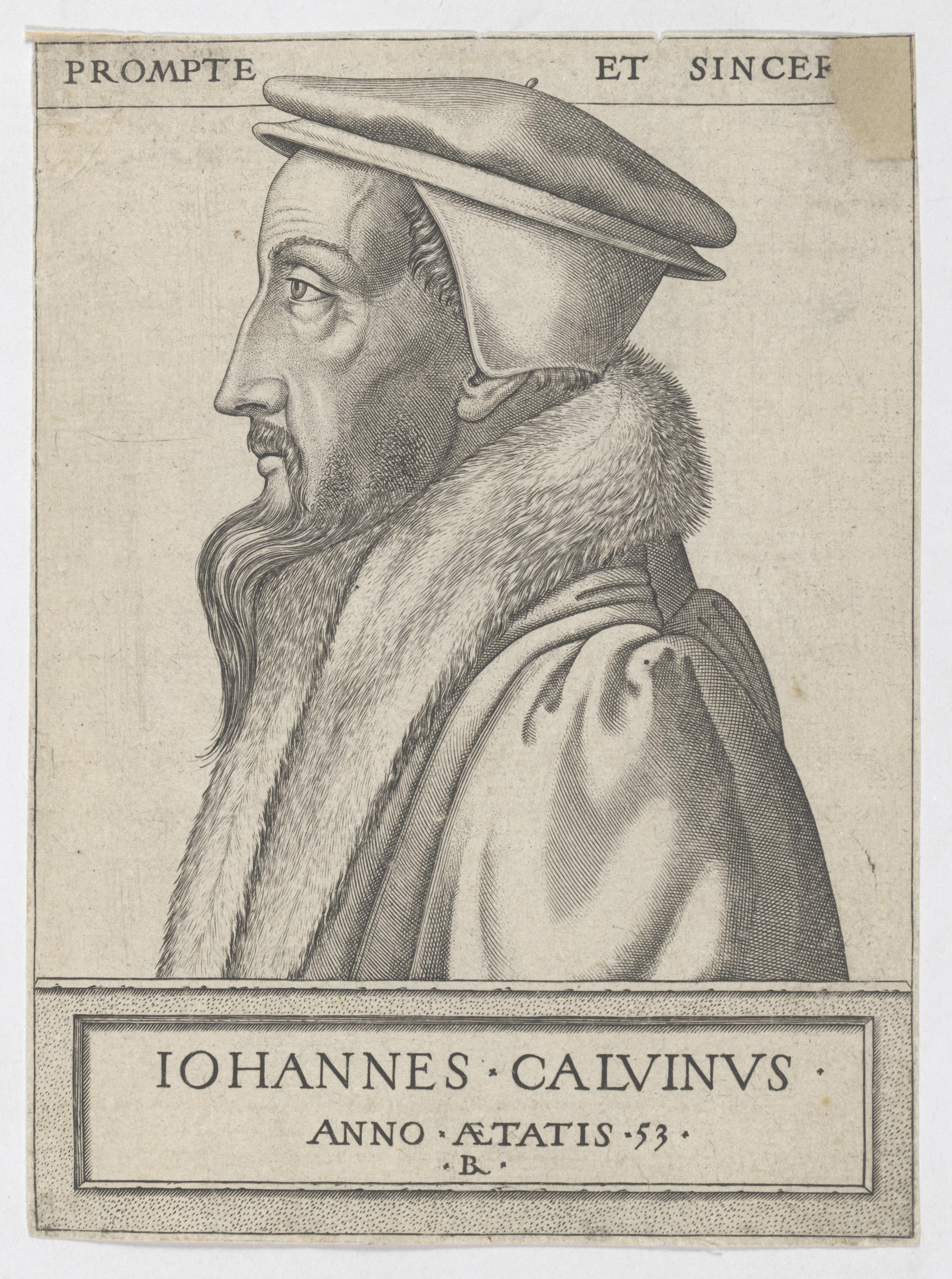
Engraving of Jean Calvin at the age of 53.

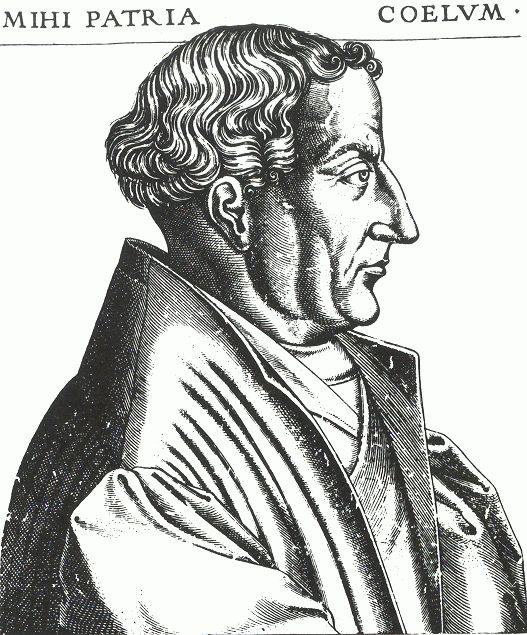
Engraving of Martin Bucer at the age of 53.
