= Heures de Charles d'Angoulême =

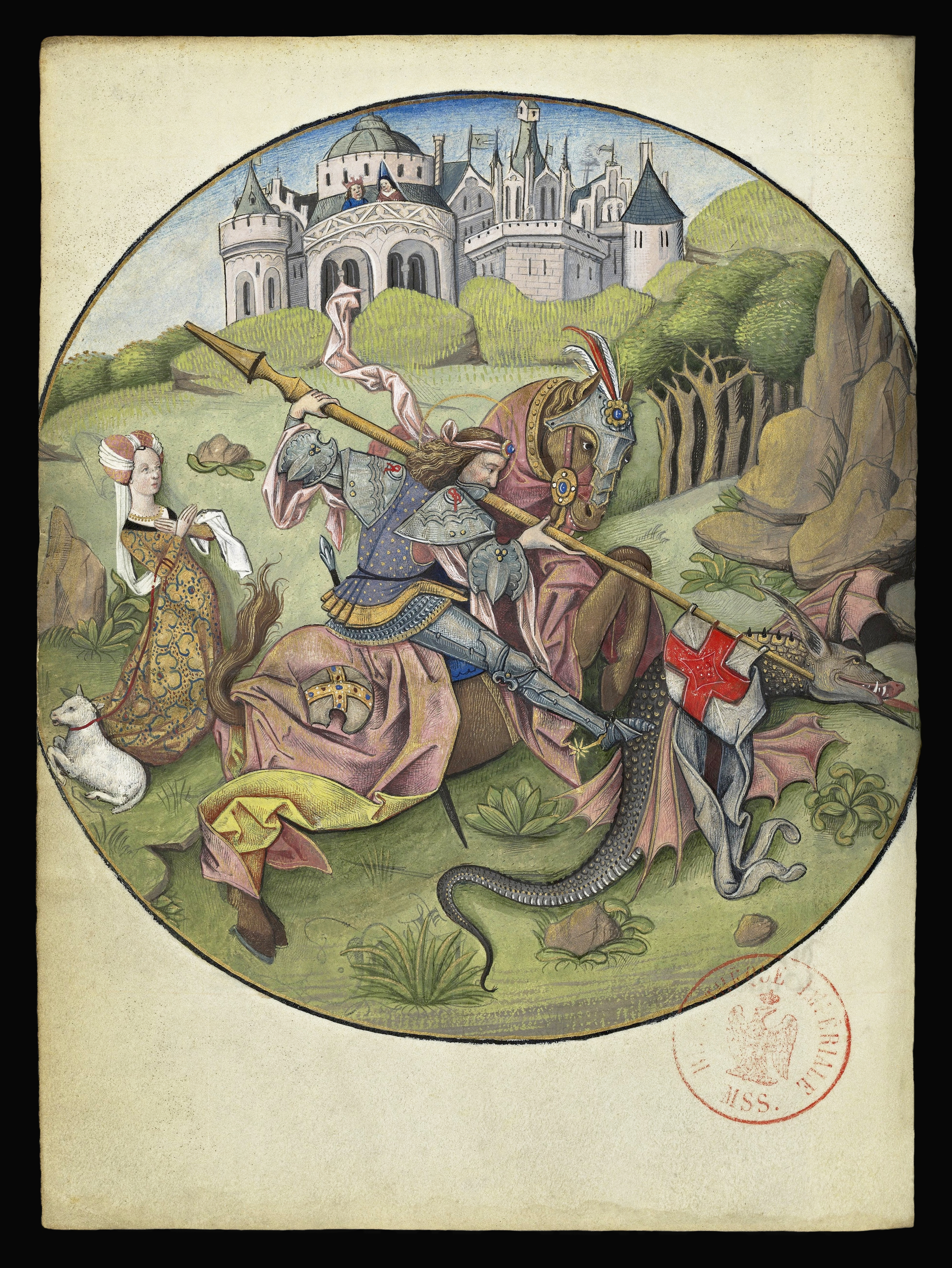
53v: Saint George and the Dragon (I. M.), f.53v (1475–1500)

The Heures de Charles d'Angoulême is a book of hours commissioned in the late 15th century, probably around 1480, by Charles, Count of Angoulême, father of King Francis I of France. It is now in the Bibliothèque nationale de France in Paris, under the number Latin 1173.

The book contains full-page miniatures mostly painted by Robinet Testard, many of which have been adapted from, and inspired by, engravings, including sixteen prints by Israhel van Meckenem which have been glued onto the vellum and overpainted. The book is notable for both the quality of its art, and its various methods of incorporating prints, which testifies to the "complex history of interchanges between printed materials and manuscript illumination during the later fifteenth century".

== Description ==
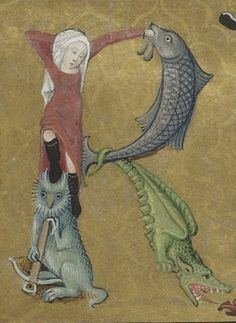
One of the inhabited letters from the manuscript's unusual Ave Maria (folio 52r)

A book of hours is a manuscript designed for personal devotion and was popular in the Middle Ages. This illuminated work made for Charles, Count of Angoulême by the painter Robinet Testard is an unusual volume and is more comprehensive than just a set of devotions. The artist seems to understand his sponsor's character. As well as its devotional purpose, the book seems designed to entertain, to arouse curiosity (f. 52v), to amuse (ff 3r, 4v and 5r), to satisfy the sponsor's aesthetic sense (ff. 16v and 26v), to encourage his pastoral feelings (f. 20v), to encourage his chivalrous instincts (f. 2v) and even to flatter him (f. 41v).

The folios most concerned with personal devotion, the Passion, Death and Resurrection of Christ (f. 106v), were in fact the work of the engraver Israhel van Meckenem, subsequently coloured by Testard with his characteristic luminous hues. Other work by painters such as Jean Bourdichon were included and may demonstrate Testard's honesty, his admittance that his talents were insufficient for the task. He also introduced some profane elements such as sexual encounters (ff. 4v and 20v), mythology (f. 41v) and chivalry (f. 53v). The text is entirely in Latin, and the book can be interpreted as being the antithesis of a book of hours, or even an anti-book of hours.

Some important pages include; the animated scene of the Annunciation to the shepherds; the mysterious image showing the death of the centaur; the moral scene "Combat between Virtue and Vice"; the political scene "Death of Louis XI"; the picture of "the Spider King and his daughter Madame Anne de Beaujeu"; and George of Cappadocia, a legendary scene which is more appropriate to a chivalric romance than a book of hours.

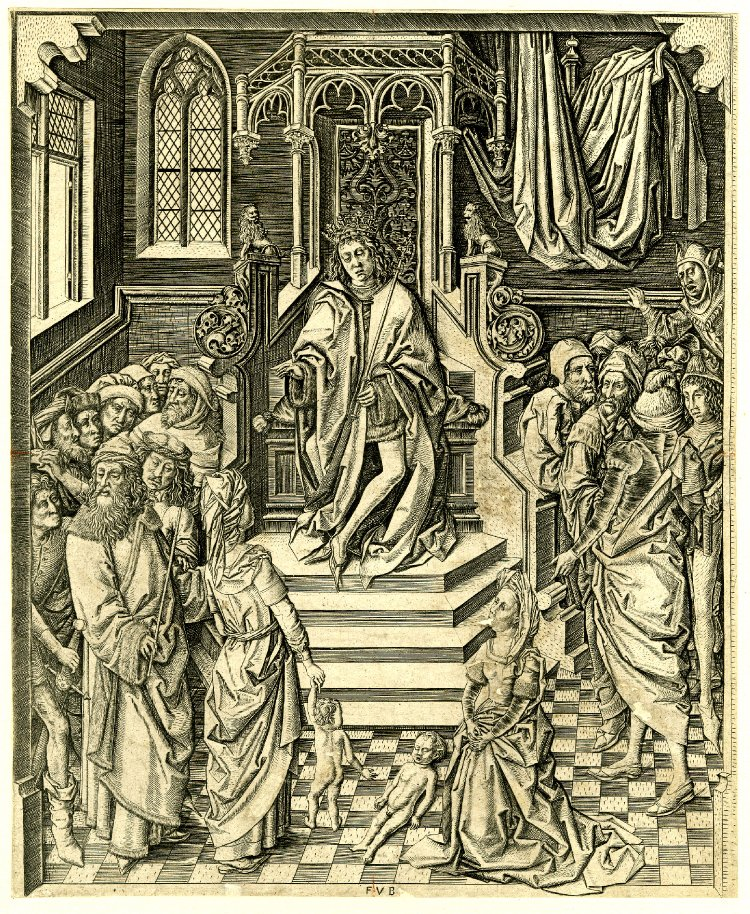
Master FVB's engraving

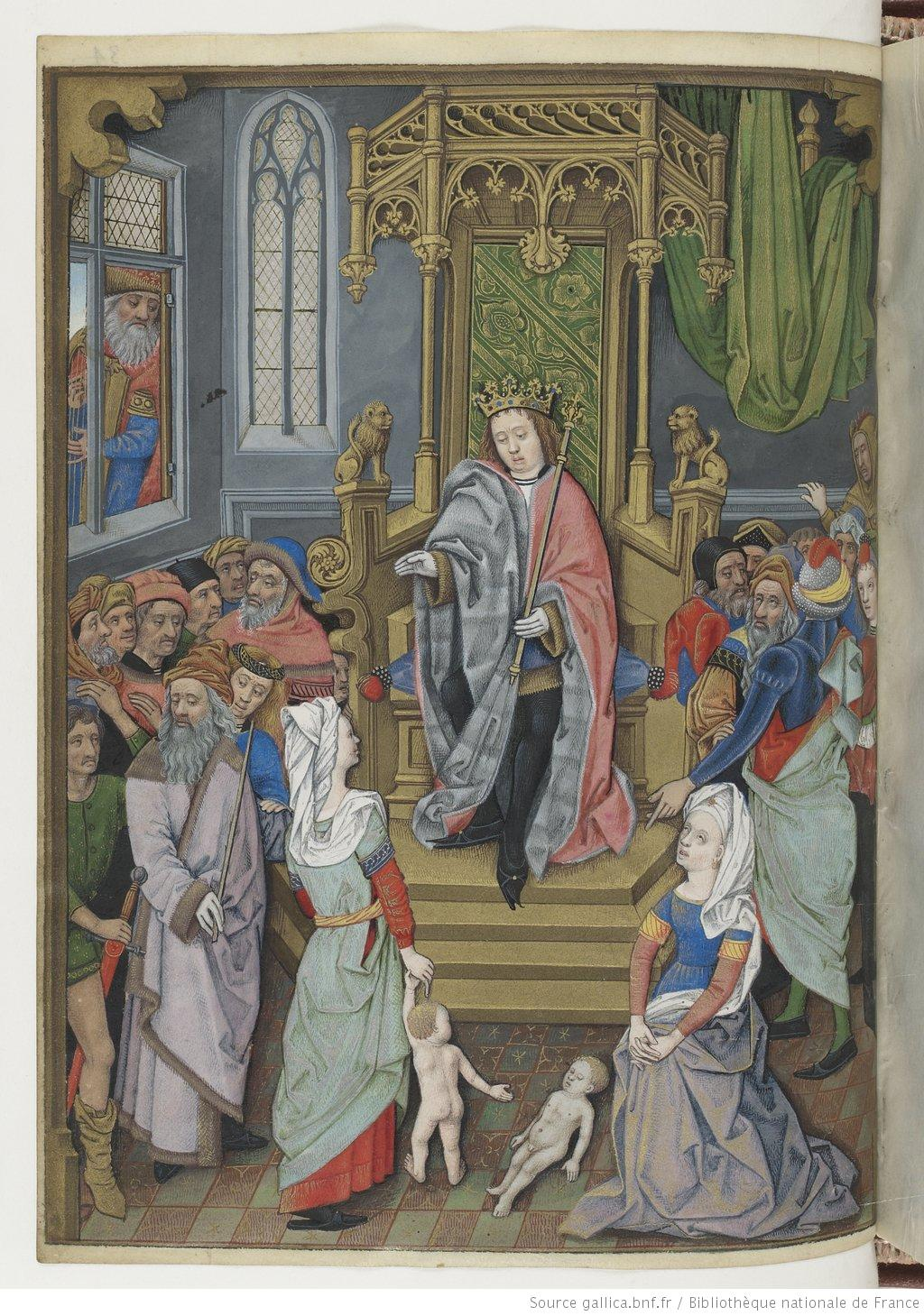
Testard's painting

An example of the use of prints in the book of hours.
Testard has borrowed the composition for his Judgment of Solomon from Netherlandish printmaker Master FVB's c. 1480 engraving. He has made several slight alterations: the appearances of the faces and costumes in some of the crowd, minor architectural details, and a slightly lower viewpoint.

== Manuscript ==
The manuscript is composed of 230 folios. It includes 38 full-page miniatures.

Selection of miniatures
Folios	Description	Miniature
1r-6v	Liturgical Calendar	
7v	Christ Pantocrator and the Tetramorph This miniature is adapted by Testard from an engraving by van Meckenem, itself a copy of an earlier 1466 print by Master E. S. The original print features John the Baptist in the centre, whom Testard has replaced with Christ amongst angels. Surrounding, the four symbols of the evangelists are arranged in a Latin cross: John's eagle (top), the winged lion of Mark (left), the bull of Luke (right), and Matthew's angel (bottom). The other medallions show the four doctors of the Church: Jerome with lion (top left); Gregory (top right), Augustine (bottom right), and Ambrose (bottom left). Testard largely keeps to original composition, which may have been a design for a paten. He has made some alterations to the faces and postures of the other characters, and added four prophets to the corners, skillfully extending and elaborating the foliate motifs to unify the image.	
9v	Annunciation	
16v	Floral composition with birds	
17v	Pentecost	
18v	Nativity of Jesus An overpainting of a van Meckenem engraving, itself a reversed version of a c. 1480 print by Martin Schongauer. The ground and sky have been extended through use of additional overpainted strips.	
20v	Annunciation to the shepherds: country dance A scene of a country dance which at first seems unconnected to this part of the book of hours. Closer examination reveals it to be a combination of religious and picturesque elements: a shepherd in the background points to an angel in the sky who is accompanied by a phylactery bearing the words of the Gloria in excelsis Deo.	
22v	Adoration of the Magi (J. B.)	
24v	Presentation of Jesus at the Temple	
26v	Floral composition	
28v	Prayer to Our Lady	
34v	Judgment of Solomon The composition of this scene is based upon a print by Master FVB. Testard has altered the faces, costumes and number of characters, introduced a lower viewpoint and made minor modifications to architectural details.	
41v	Death and the Centaur Testard has been influenced here by Netherlandish printmaker Master I. A. M. of Zwolle's Battle of Two Men with a Centaur, to which he introduces Death, a lion and a wild-woman. Interpretation of this scene is problematic. Typically understood to represent a Centaur battling the Lapiths, a purely mythological tale and unusual subject for use in the "Office for the Dead", Belkin posits that this contest between man and beast is "symbolic of the struggle against dark forces. The Centaur and the wild woman form a single unit—the personification of vice in terms of Christian allegory. The private nature of the Book of Hours leads one to infer that Charles used the allegory of the struggle with the Vices for his own political vendetta against his rivals, conveying in this enigmatic miniature his bitter enmity towards those who had wronged him."	
52r	Ave Maria 17 historiated letters on a background of gold which spell "Ave Maria, gracia ple[na]" from the first chapter of Luke. This is the reading for the Feast of the Annunciation (March 25) The first letter is copied from the alphabet of Master E. S. (itself inspired by the late-14th century pattern-book by Giovannino de' Grassi). Testard seems to have modeled the rest of the letters upon another woodblock alphabet of around 1464 from Flanders or the Netherlands.	
52v	Diagram for calculating the date of Easter On the reverse of the Ave Maria is a diagram for calculating the date of Easter. Originally, "the vivid colours of the concentric circles behind the diagram must have stood out more clearly against the cream-coloured parchment [however] one of the components used to make the golden ground of the Ave Maria, probably silver, has gone rusty and seeped deep into the parchment". The main spoke, pointing up, features a sequence of nineteen Roman numerals representing years in the Metonic cycle.	
53v	Saint George and the Dragon (I. M.) A print by van Meckenem, lightly coloured by Testard, depicting St George, patron saint of chivalry and military orders across medieval Europe. "The choice of this dragon-slaying saint rather than St Michael, the patron saint of the crown of France from Louis XI onwards, was probably the result of a desire to disassociate Charles from the king of France". Testard leaves the original print largely unaltered except for the conical hat and veil of the princess which he has replaced with a turban reflecting contemporary fashion.	
59v	Last Supper and prayer in the garden (I. M.)	
74v	Arrest of Jesus (I. M.)	
77v	Sanhedrin trial of Jesus (I. M.)	
80v	Flagellation of Christ (I. M.)	
87v	Crown of thorns (I. M.)	
89v	Ecce homo (I. M.)	
91v	Pontius Pilate washes his hands (I. M.)	
94v	Stations of the Cross (I. M.)	
97v	Crucifixion of Jesus (I. M.)	
106v	Burial of Jesus (I. M.)	
110v	Resurrection of Jesus (I. M.)	
113v	Emmaus (I. M.)	

== See also ==
- Charles, Count of Angoulême

== Bibliography ==
- Matthews, Anne (1986). "The use of prints in the Hours of Charles d'Angoulême". Print Quarterly. Vol. 3, no. 1. pp. 4–18. JSTOR 41823707.
- Les Heures de Charles d’Angoulême (facsimile of the manuscript), M. Moleiro Editor, 230 p. Read online
- Belkin, Ahuva (1990). ""La Mort du Centaure". A propos de la miniature 41v du "Livre d'Heures" de Charles d'Angoulême". Artibus et Historiae. 11 (21): 31–38. doi:10.2307/1483382. JSTOR 1483382.
