= Ark of Doudleby =

Late Gothic altar paintings

The Ark of Doudleby (1494) is a set of three double-sided painted panels that were part of a winged altar, the centre of which was probably a cabinet with a statue of Pieta. This incompletely preserved altar is the finest set of late Gothic paintings in the collection of the Aleš South Bohemian Gallery in Hluboká nad Vltavou.

The Ark of Doudleby (front side)

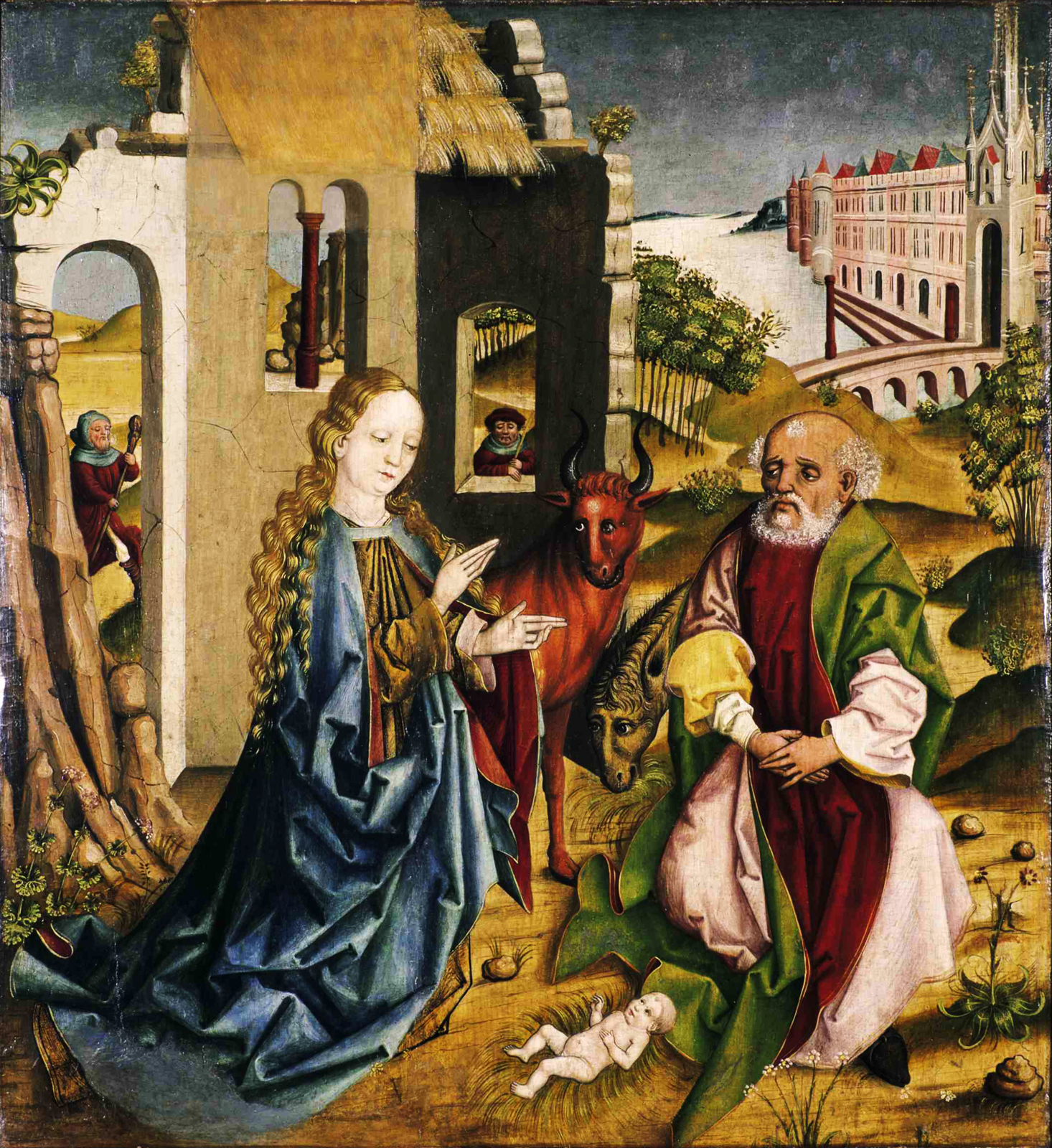
Nativity of the Lord

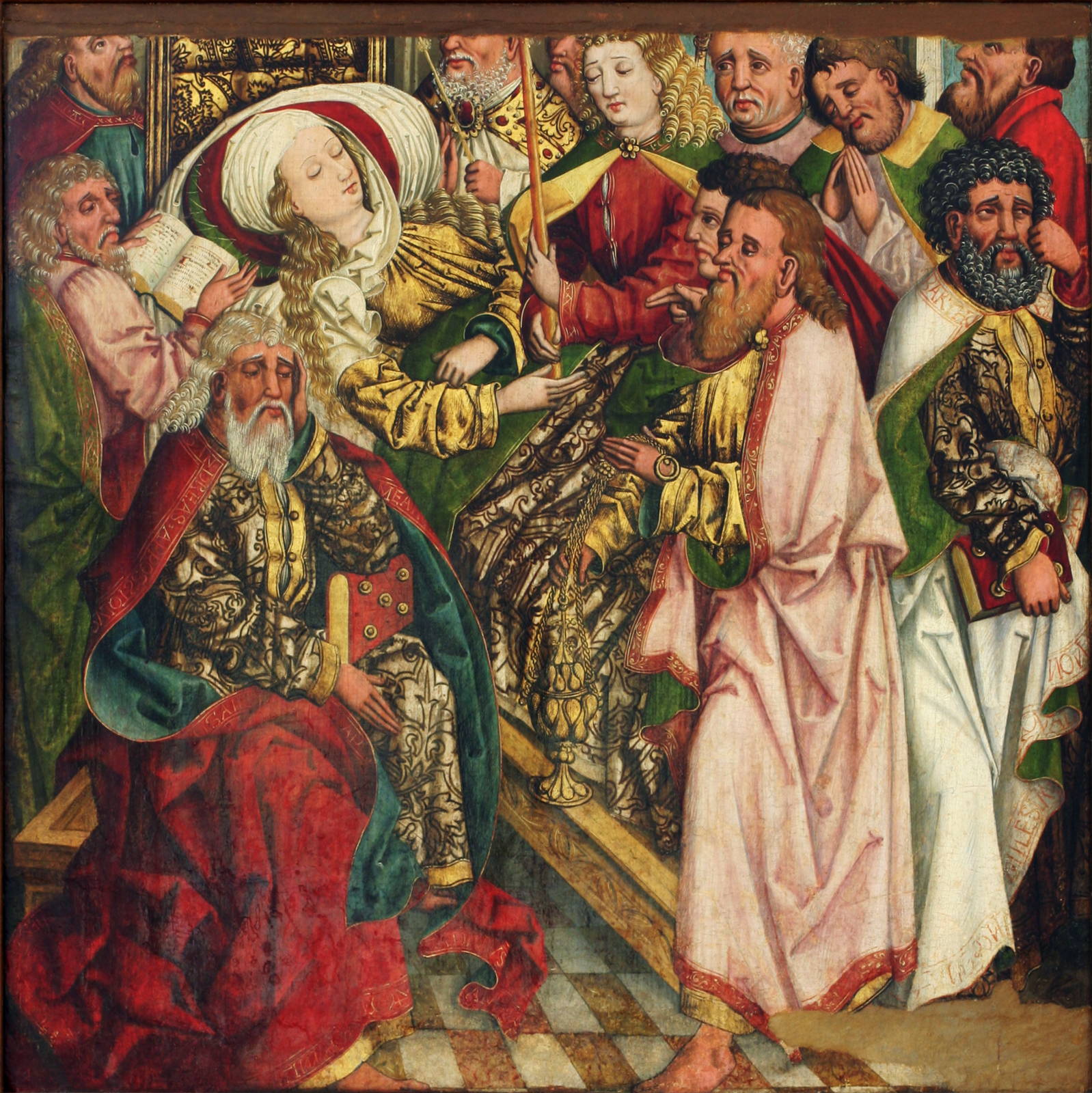
Death of the Virgin Mary

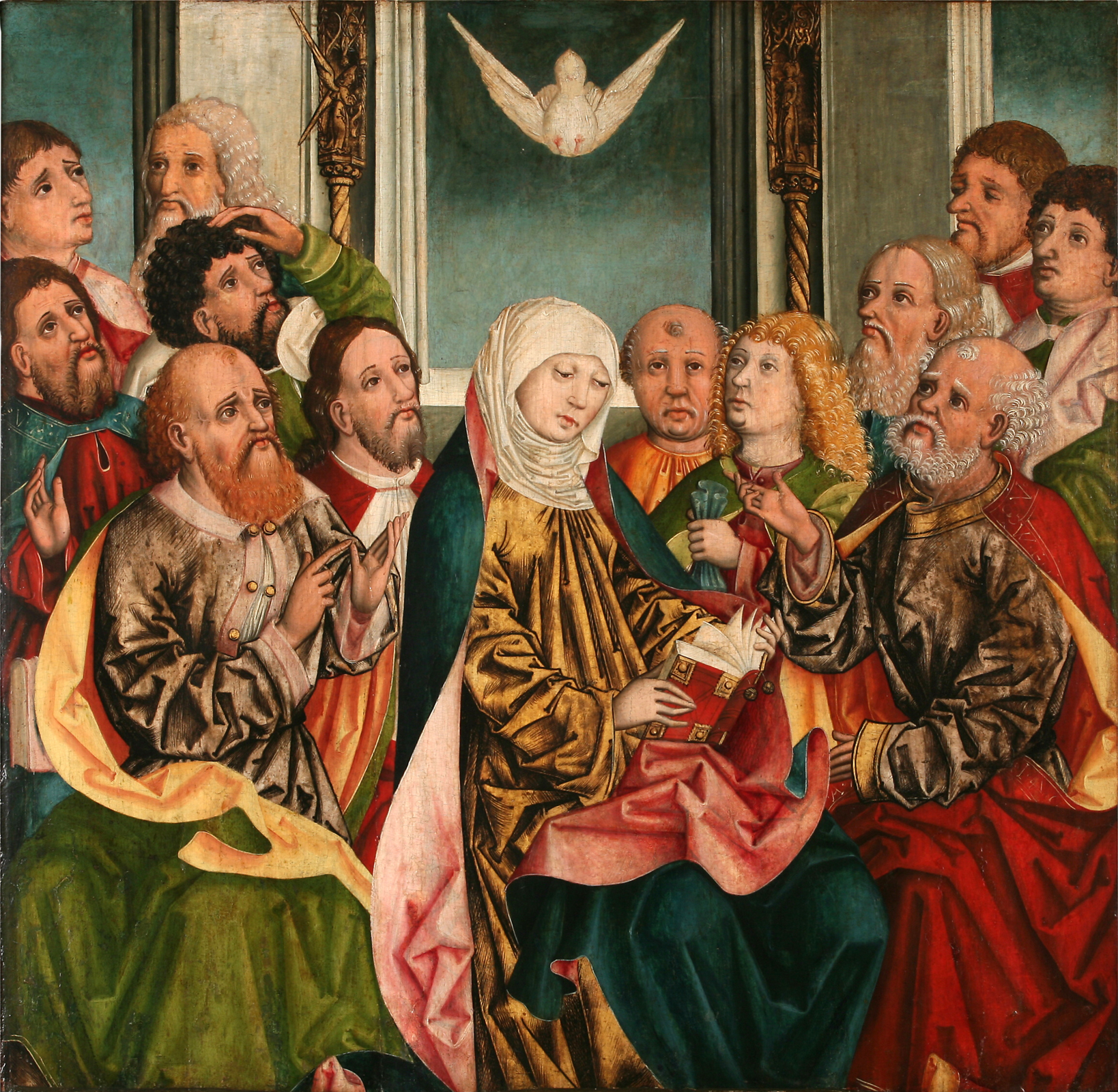
Descent of the Holy Spirit

(2nd wing and middle part missing)
The Ark of Doudleby (rear side)

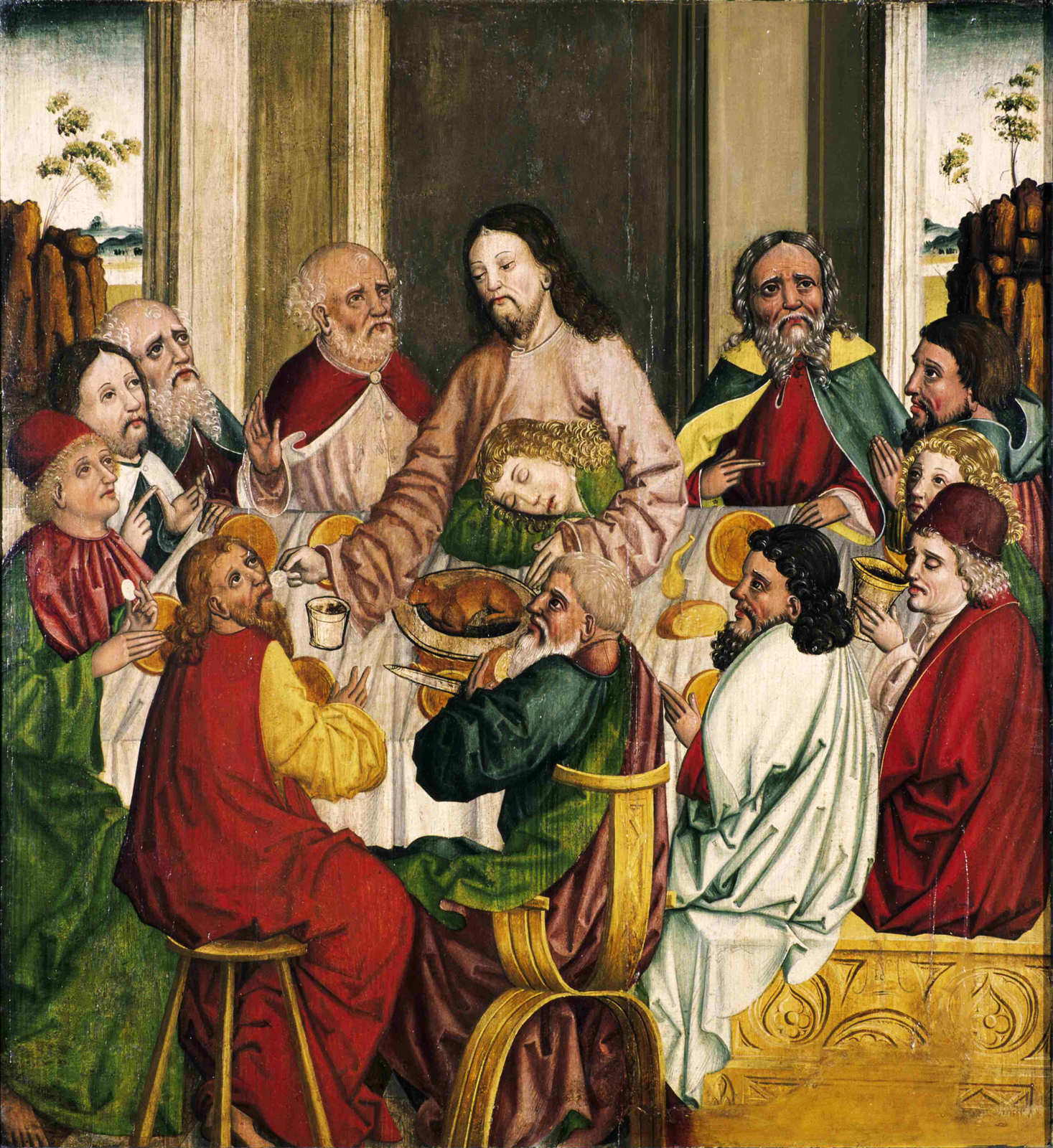
The Last Supper

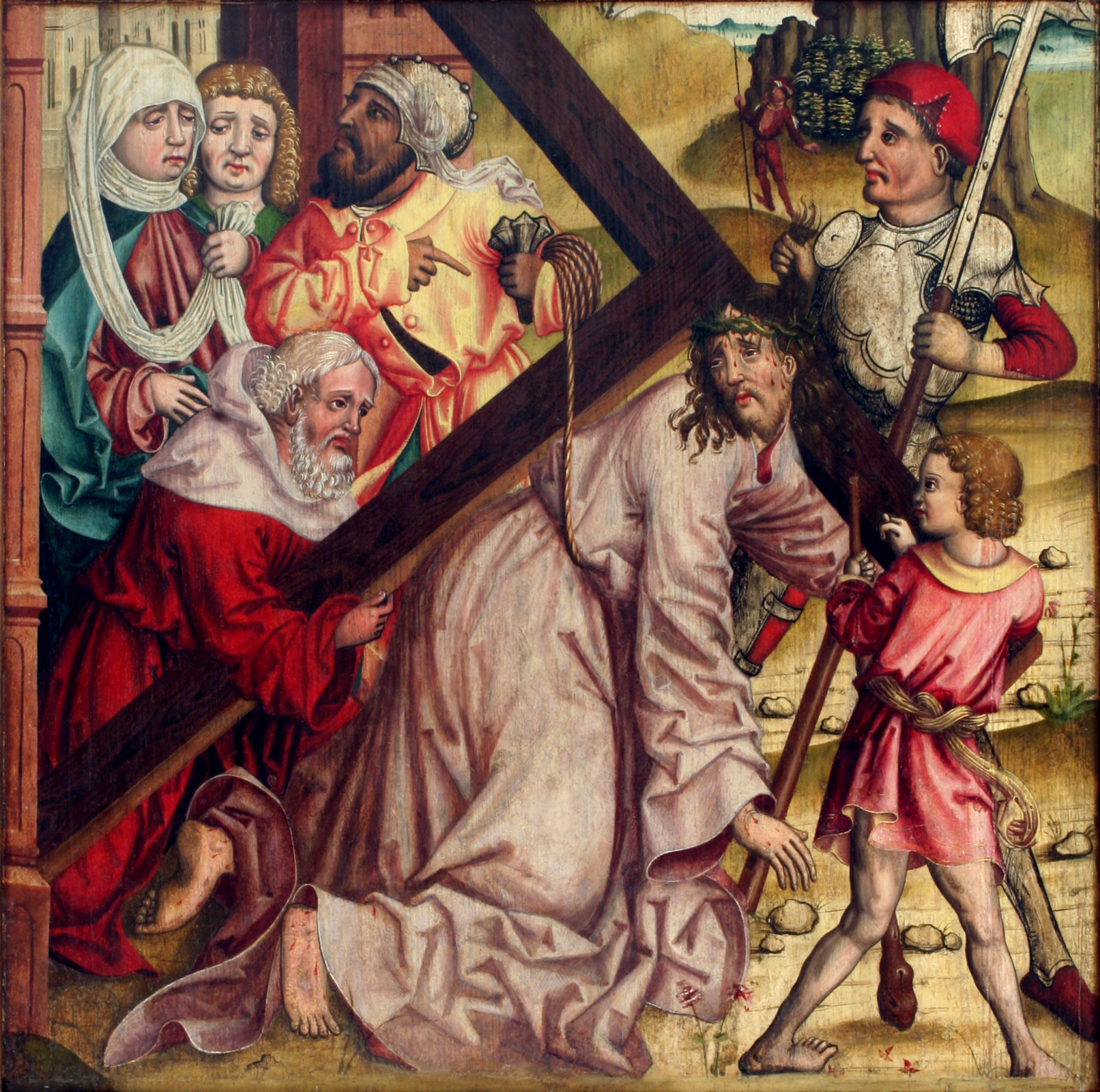
Carrying the cross

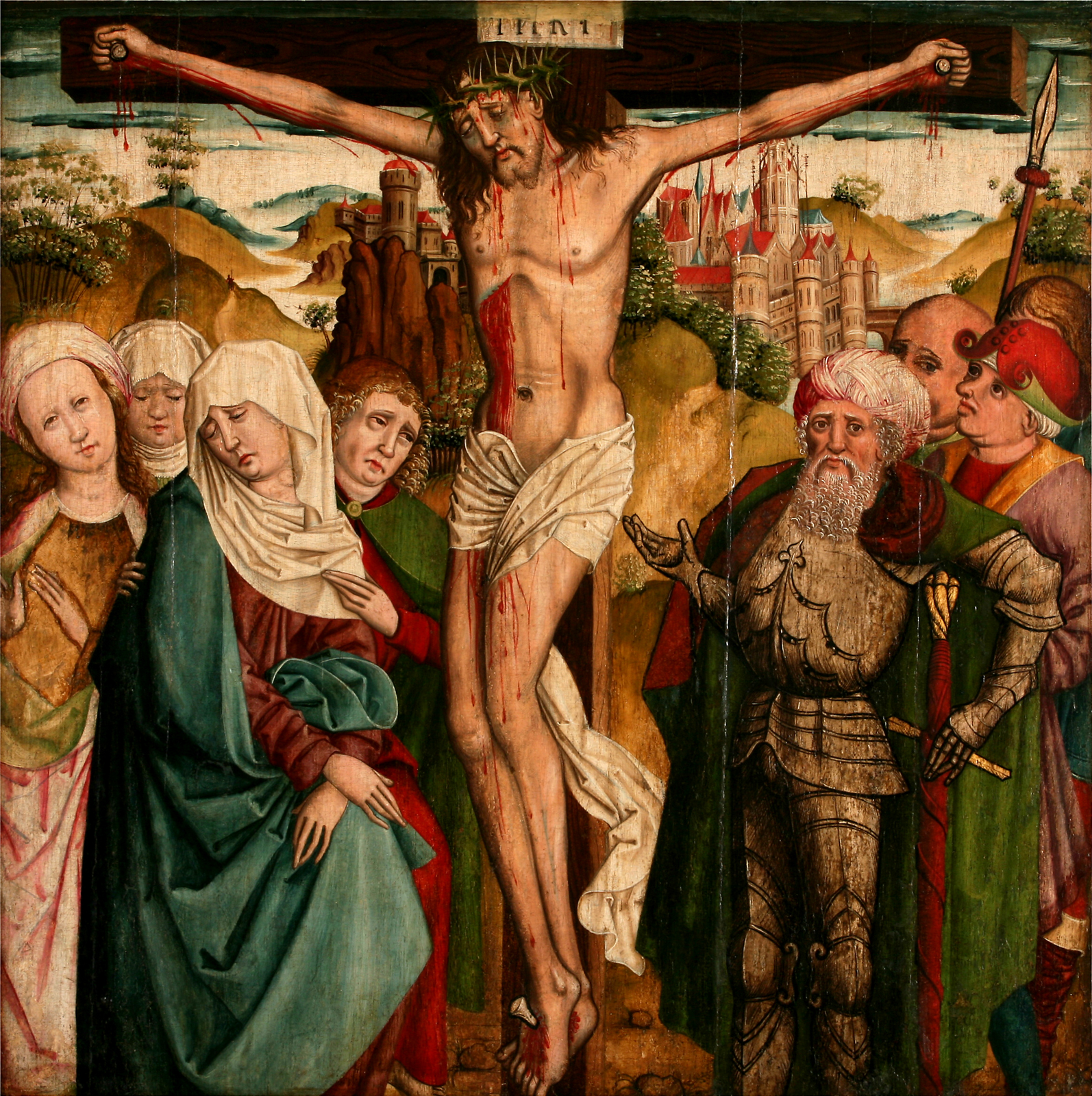
Crucifixion

(2nd wing missing)

== History ==
Doudleby has been the seat of a deanery since 1143. The painting of the Madonna of Doudleby from 1440 comes from there (now on display at the National Gallery in Prague). The altar boards were used as the filling of the organ case in the early gothic parish church of St. Vincent (church nave completed in 1494) and found during its repair. Since then they have been in the collection of Antonín Matúš. In 1890 they were purchased from him by the Municipal Museum in České Budějovice and in 1953 they were transferred to the collection of the Aleš South Bohemian Gallery in Hluboká nad Vltavou.

== Description and classification ==
Three double-sided painted wooden panels measuring 103 x 94, 94 x 93 and 94 x 95 cm. One of the altar wings is missing, the others have been cut short. Painted in tempera on a chalk ground with detailed black underpainting. The colour layer is damaged in several places and replaced by retouches. Restored by Johann Wodiczka (1923), Bohuslav Slánský (1936) and Ludmila Slánská (1949).

The altarpiece comes from a South German painting workshop (probably Nuremberg) and is influenced by Dutch painting. The striking draughtsmanship of the paintings is explained by the extensive use of graphic designs by various artists (Martin Schongauer, Master E. S., Monogrammists FVB, AG, Václav of Olomouc, Israhel van Meckenem, Alaert du Hamel). Almost all of the figural types can be derived from the circle of Michael Wolgemut's workshop, especially from his altars in Zwickau and Straubing. The artist also shares with Wolgemut his predilection for brocade fabrics and the omission of halos.

The characters are depicted in rich clothing appropriate to the Dutch fashion of the time. They communicate with each other with their gaze and hand gestures and also address the viewer. The strength of the work is its power of expression and emotional engagement with the subject matter. Some of the face types are repeated. There are interior constructions in the background or views of an imaginary landscape with rocks, mountains and buildings, accompanied by details taken from nature.

The altar wings, showing scenes from the life of Mary, probably complemented the carved statue of Pieta, which was preserved in the church and formed the centre of the altar. Pieta has been stolen in 1993. On the closed wings there are Passion themes. According to Pešina, the pairs of panels on either side of the altar case were arranged as follows (top to bottom, left to right): 1.Nativity of the Lord / Last Supper, 2. The missing wing (probably the Adoration of the Magi / Christ on the Mount of Olives), 3. Death of the Virgin Mary / Carrying of the Cross, 4. Descent of the Holy Spirit / Crucifixion

=== Nativity of the Lord ===
In the Nativity scene, the child lies on a mandorla-shaped haystack on the bare ground between Mary and Joseph. The kneeling Virgin Mary, her hands in a gesture of wonder, has a halo marked with a simple engraved circular line. The pressed folds of Mary's cloak correspond to contemporary graphic designs. In the background, shepherds peer through the windows. On the right is a bridge with a Gothic tower and the walls of the town of Bethlehem, the window in the wall of the ruined hut is Romanesque .

=== The Death of the Virgin Mary ===
The Virgin Mary rests on a low diagonally placed bed, touching a candle with her right hand. Surrounding her are the twelve apostles, of whom the leftmost stands out, St. Andrew seated with a book in a rich red cloak, the apostle with a censer in a pink cloak, and St. Bartholomew standing behind him, his face averted. Apostle Peter, wearing a white alb and golden pluvial fastened with a clasp, stands behind the head of the Virgin Mary. The garments of the other apostles are also made of precious fabrics, with gold paint and brocade patterns. Some of the faces have been damaged by careless cutting of the upper part of the plate. The hem of the mantle of the Apostle Andrew bears the year 1494.

=== The Descent of the Holy Spirit ===
A dove, representing the Holy Spirit, hovers in the window, the niche of which is decorated with tessellated columns and statues of the Archangel Gabriel and the Virgin Mary, thus linking the scene with the Annunciation. The Virgin Mary, with an open book, is seated in the middle between the twelve apostles, dressed in a golden robe and blue mantle, her head wrapped in a white veil. The shading of the garments is supplemented in places by hatching.

=== The Last Supper ===
Jesus, surrounded by apostles, sits at table with sacrificial lamb, bread and wine. To his right is St. Peter, with St. John the Evangelist resting under his left arm in a green robe. To Judas, seated opposite him, he presents the host as a symbol of the unbloody sacrifice of the mass. In the background a window overlooks a rocky landscape.

=== Carrying the cross ===
The painting depicts the fifth stop of the Stations of the Cross, where Christ, who has fallen to his knee under the weight of the cross, is assisted by Simon of Cyrene. Behind him stand the Virgin Mary and St John. A little boy, carrying a staff, makes a mocking jibe at Christ. A soldier in a helmet and yellow coat, holding a rope tied around Christ's waist, carries in his left hand the spikes with which he will be nailed to the cross. A barbarian in armour and carrying a spear holds Christ by the hair. The landscape in the background is stony and desolate.

=== Crucifixion ===
The Crucifixion with one T-shaped cross and eight standing figures is set in a hilly landscape with a walled city (Jerusalem) in the centre. Jesus is depicted with a flowing loincloth and massive strands of blood oozing from the wounds. In the left foreground, the Virgin Mary, supported by St. John, stands in the foreground, turning away her face. She is accompanied by two Marys. On the opposite side stands a centurion in a green cloak with red lining and silver armour, leaning on a sword and pointing to the Messiah with his right hand. In the background, the spear with which Longinus pierced Jesus' side is visible.

== Sources ==
- Registration sheet, inv. no. O-10, Aleš South Bohemian Gallery in Hluboká nad Vltavou
- Hynek Látal, Petra Lexová, Martin Vaněk, Meziprůzkumy, AJG Collection 1300-2016, no. 25, Aleš South Bohemian Gallery in Hluboká nad Vltavou 2016, ISBN 978-80-87799-52-9
- Fajt J, Chlumská Š, Bohemia and Central Europe 1220-1550, National Gallery in Prague 2014, ISBN 978-80-7035-569-5
- Roman Lavička, Gothic Art, Aleš South Bohemian Gallery 2008, pp. 41–43, ISBN 978-80-86952-57-4
- Hynek Rulíšek, Gothic Art of South Bohemia, Guide, vol. 3, Aleš South Bohemian Gallery in Hluboká nad Vltavou 1989, ISBN 80-900057-6-4
- Hynek Rulíšek, Gothic Art in South Bohemia, National Gallery in Prague 1989, ISBN 80-7035-013-X
- Karel Otavský, in: Catalogue of panel painting, South Bohemian Late Gothic 1450-1530, pp. 278–279, Aleš South Bohemian Gallery in Hluboká nad Vltavou 1965
