= Franz von Bocholt =

German engraver (fl. 1458–1480)

Franz von Bocholt was a German engraver, working between 1458 and 1480.

== Life ==
According to the 16th-century writer Matthias Quad, in his book Teutscher Nation Herrlichkeit ("The Excellency of the German Nation"), Bocholt invented the process of engraving on copper, although by the late 18th century Joseph Strutt could describe this theory as "with the greatest justice, generally exploded". Strutt also disputed Quad's idea that Bocholt's works were drawn from nature, describing them as "in general, stiff, laboured copies, from the works of Israel van Mecheln and Martin Schoon".

According to Quad, Bocholt was a shepherd at Mons in Hainault, but he is more likely to have come from Bocholt, a small town in the bishopric of Münster. His prints, fifty-five, are mostly copies after those of Martin Schongauer and Von Meckenen, although he also engraved a few plates from his own designs. His works are generally signed with the initials "F. v. B.".

== Works ==
His engravings include:

=== Copies from after Schongauer ===
- St. Anthony carried into the air by demons (original).
- St. James reading.
- St. Michael and the Dragon.

=== Copies after Israel von Meckenen ===
- The Judgment of Solomon.
- The Annunciation.
- The Virgin and Child; in an arch.

=== Subjects from his own designs ===
- A Friar struggling with a Girl, who defends herself with her distaff.
- Samson strangling the Lion.
- Two men Quarrelling.
- St. George and the Dragon.
