= Master FVB =

Netherlandish anonymous engraver

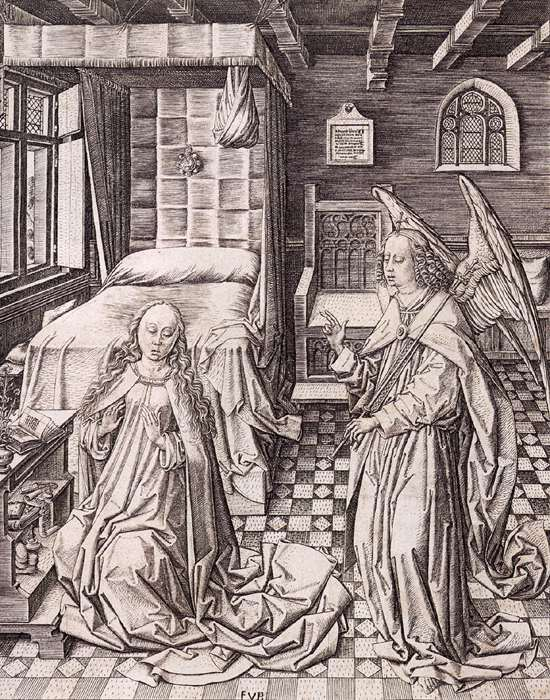
The Annunciation (c. 1480), engraving on paper, 204 mm (8.03 in) x 161 mm (6.34 in). Rijksmuseum Amsterdam (among others)

Master FVB (active c. 1480 — 1500) was an anonymous early Netherlandish engraver. According to one tradition, the artist is identical to Franz von Bocholt, but there seems to be no evidence to support such a claim.

Arthur M. Hind remarks on the influence of Dieric Bouts on the work of Master FVB. Hind also notes about Master FVB that "in spirit he comes nearer than any engraver of the time to the Master of the Amsterdam Cabinet and Schongauer."
