= Robinet Testard =

16th-century French illuminator and painter

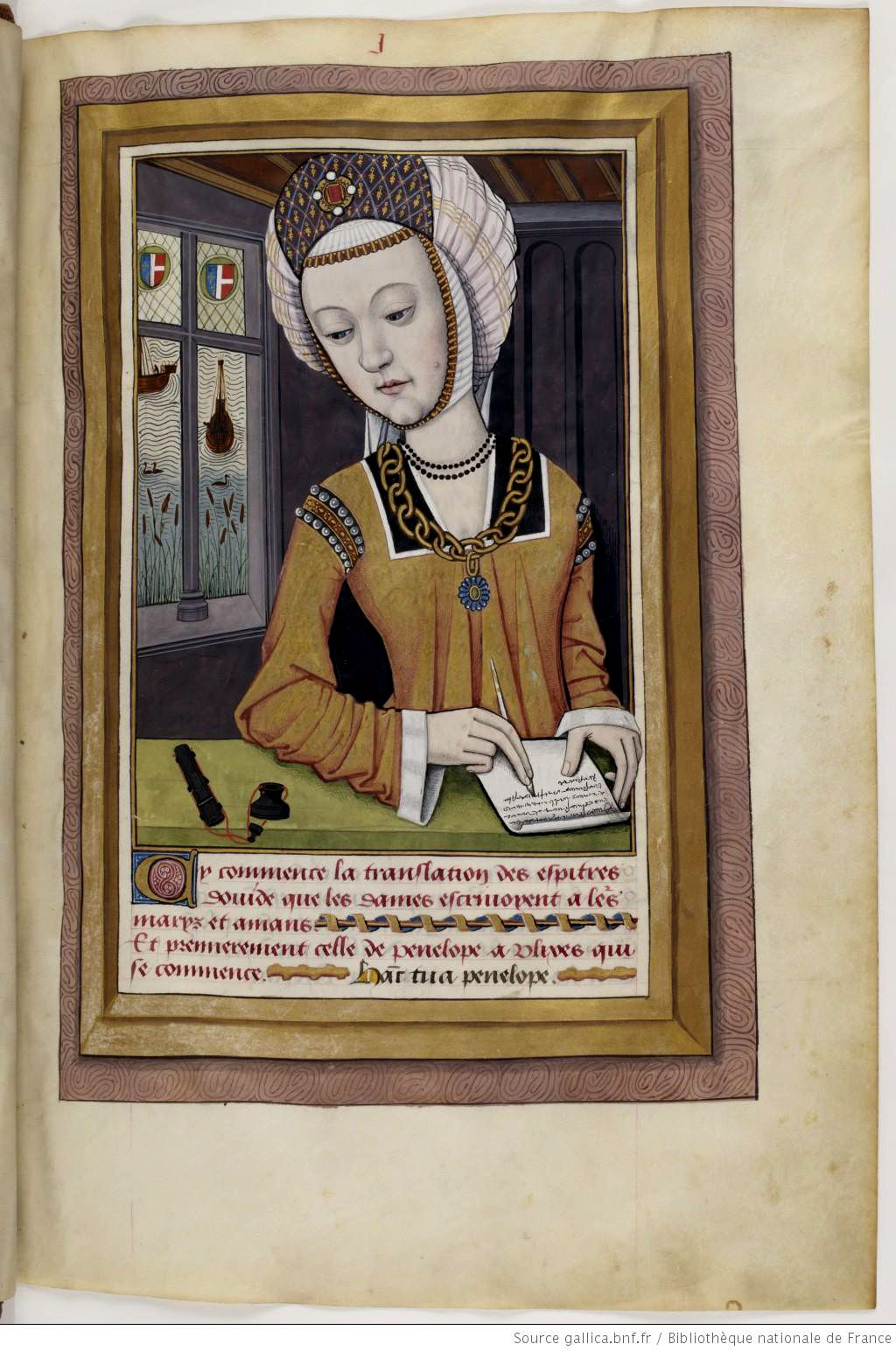
Plate from Ovid's "Héroïdes ou Epîtres", Penelope writing to Ulysses

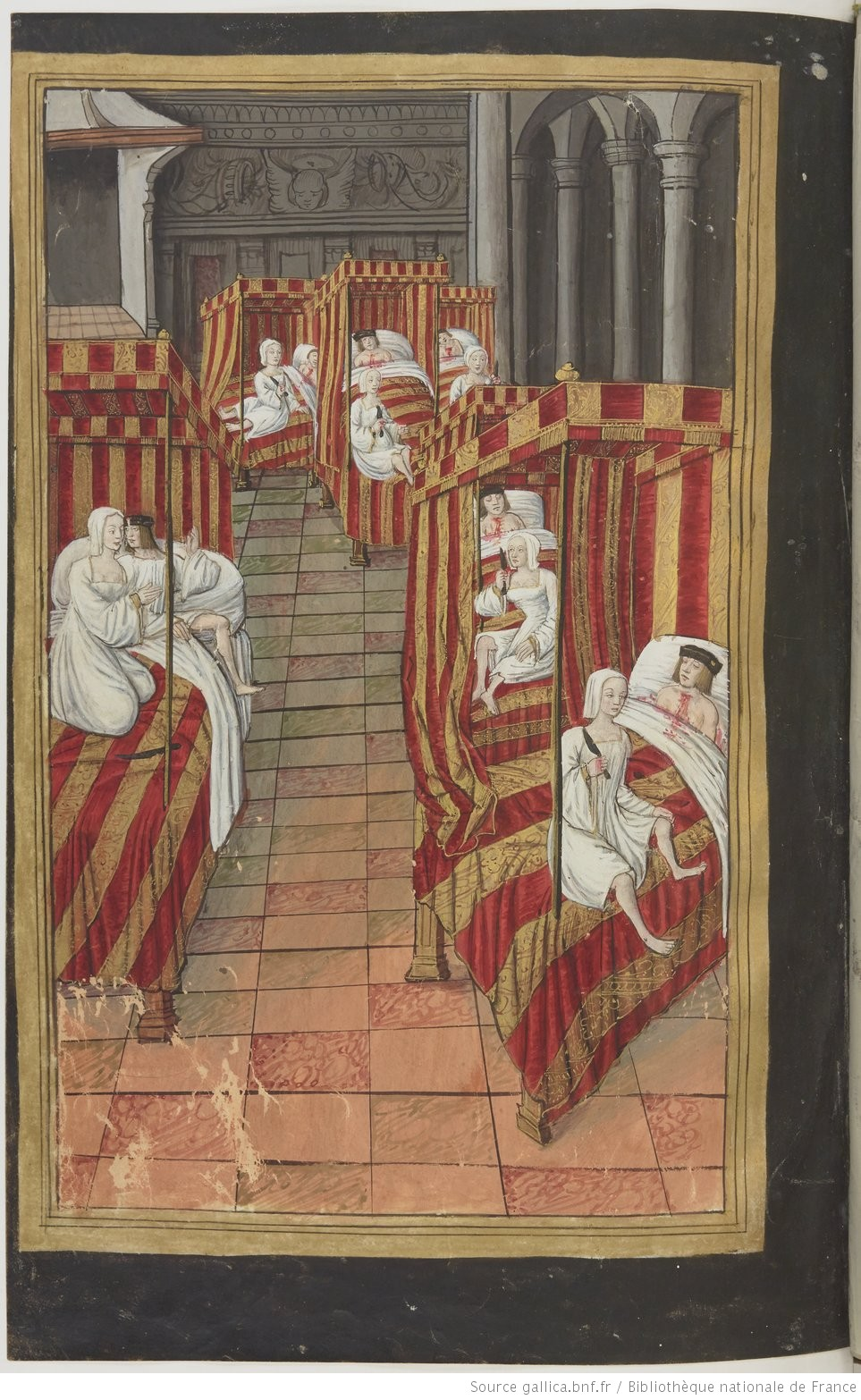
The Danaïdes murder their husbands

Robinet Testard (fl. 1470–1531) was a French illuminator and painter, whose works are difficult to attribute since none of them were signed or dated. He is known to have worked for the family of Charles, Count of Angoulême (1459–96) in Cognac, and made Valet de Chambre to the family in 1484. When the Count of Angoulême died in 1496, Testard accepted service with the Count's widow, Louise of Savoy, and is mentioned at the time of her death in 1531.

Testard started his career in Poitiers. His works include a page in a Missal for Poitiers Use, the La Rochefoucauld Hours, and two other Books of Hours. His middle period, characterised by tight compositions and sharply defined colouring, is typified by his Roman de la Rose, the Nouailher Missal and the Book of Hours, probably painted for Charles, Count of Angoulême about 1480. Surprisingly, 17 engravings by Israhel van Meckenem were included in the tome and coloured by Testard. He produced another Book of Hours, a copy of Dioskurides and mythological illustrations after Solinus and Pliny titled Les Secrets de l'histoire naturelle contenant les merveilles et choses memorables du monde. He also illustrated Matthaeus Platearius' "The Book of Simple Medicines"
