= Master E. S. =

Printmaker, goldsmith, artist (1420–1467)

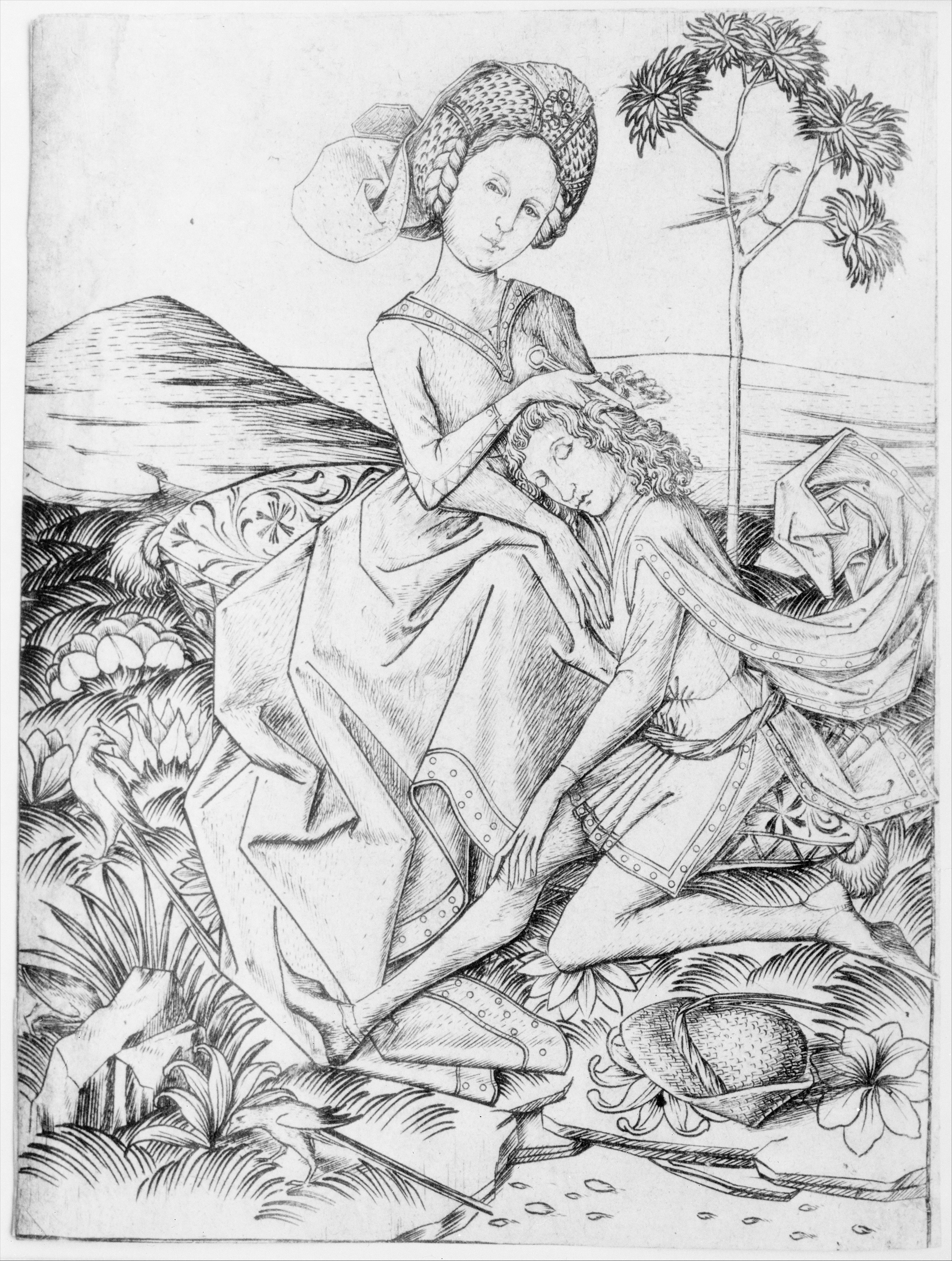
Delilah cutting Samson's hair, c. 1460

Master E. S. (c. 1420 – c. 1468; previously known as the Master of 1466) is an unidentified German engraver, goldsmith, and printmaker of the late Gothic period. He was the first major German artist of old master prints and was greatly copied and imitated. The name assigned to him by art historians, Master E. S., is derived from the monogram, E. S., which appears on eighteen of his prints (variants appear on others). The title, Master, is used for unidentified artists who operated independently. He was probably the first printmaker to place his initials on his work.

Remaining signed works by E. S. indicate that he was active in printmaking from 1450 to 1467, the latest date to appear on one of his prints. After this date, he is presumed to have died. He was the most distinguished German engraver before Martin Schongauer.

== Life ==
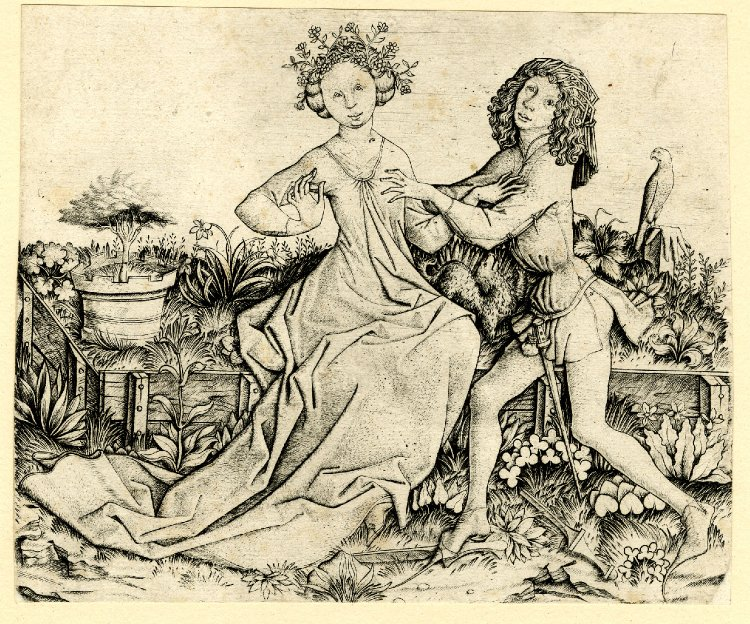
Lovers on a Grassy Bank. The man has discarded his patten overshoes; the woman still wears hers.

Master E. S. probably came from southwestern Germany or Switzerland, as did the engraver called the Master of the Playing Cards. This view rests mainly on stylistic comparisons with the contemporary painting of that region. Although evidence indicates that he was most active in the Upper Rhine region, there also is evidence that he visited Mainz, to the south on the Rhine at the confluence of the Main River opposite Wiesbaden, a major economic and cultural centre.

None of the attempts to match documented persons with his initials have met with general acceptance. The term master meant someone who had completed an apprenticeship and ran his own workshop, as E. S. clearly did. Marriage and employing apprentices to learn the skills could sometimes also be requirements.

E. S. probably came from a background and training as a goldsmith, rather than as a painter. He sometimes used goldsmith punches in his prints (for example, to make the circles on the borders of the clothes in the Delilah print above) and some works are clearly designs for metalwork. He was the first printmaker to sign his prints with an engraved monogram, which was standard practice on significant pieces of metalwork. He engraved two images of Saint Eligius, the patron-saint of goldsmiths. He liked to fill his engravings with decorative detail, sometimes overloading the composition, and only slowly does a sense of volume or recession develop in his work.

Since his earliest prints show a practiced use of the burin, he is presumed to have worked as a goldsmith for some years before beginning printmaking. His date of birth is estimated on this basis. His level of production of prints probably means that he worked on these only during his later years. Another important printmaker and goldsmith, Israhel van Meckenem, was probably his leading assistant at the end of his career and forty-one of his plates passed to him, being reworked by van Meckenem.

== Work ==
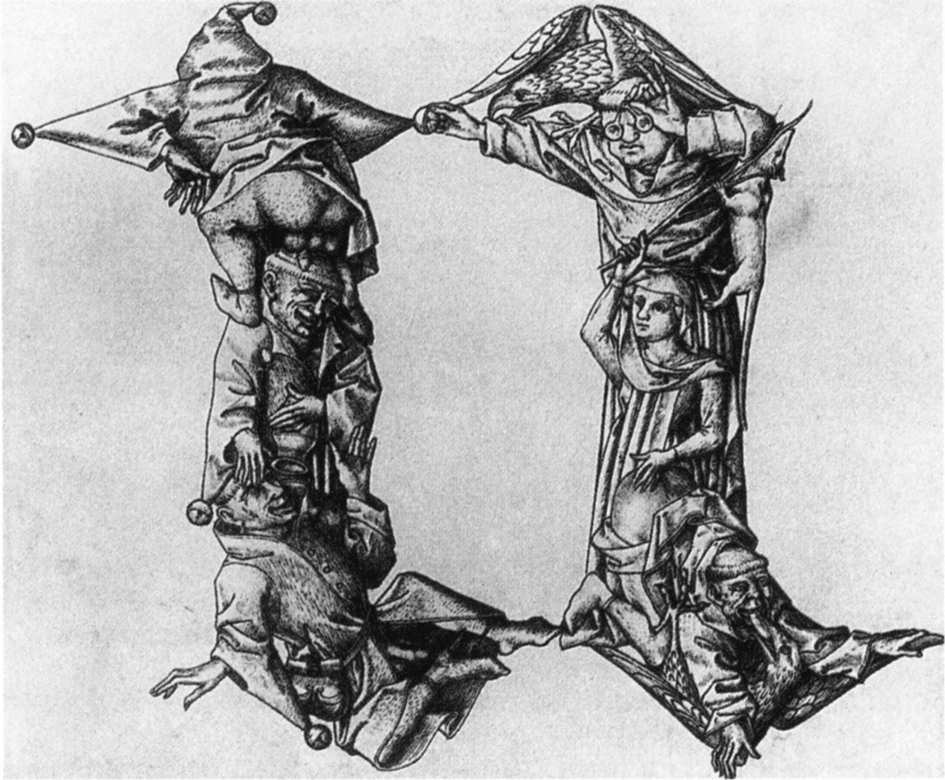
Letter N of the Fantastic Alphabet, Master E. S., c. 1465

Shestack divides the engravings of E. S. into three stylistic periods: around 1450, up to 1460, and after 1460. During the second period he made significant technical developments. Firstly, deeper incisions with the burin, which allowed more impressions to be taken from each plate, although the number still may have been limited to about sixty or so, before wear on the plate began to show and reworking was necessary for it to be used again. His use of hatching (parallel lines) and cross-hatching to depict shading and volume, steadily grew more sophisticated and his figure-drawing became more confident, sometimes overconfident. Many figures of this period have contorted poses even when at rest. In works from the third period, his figures are more relaxed and flat surfaces are given prominence in the compositions.

Many faces of his subjects have a rather pudding-like appearance, and are overly-large for their bodies, which diminishes the quality of otherwise, fine works. Much of his work still has great charm, and the secular and comic subjects he engraved are rarely found in the surviving painting of the period.

Lehrs catalogues three hundred and eighteen engravings by E. S. and of these, ninety-five are unique, and fifty exist in only two impressions (copies). There are a further thirty-eight engravings by his probable assistant, Israhel van Meckenem, which are considered to be copies of engravings by E. S. which have not survived. In total, Shestack estimates, there may have been about five hundred engravings by E. S.

Hind notes the influence of the Master of the Playing Cards on the work of Master E. S. He adds that "E. S. does not rank high as an artist, but on the technical side he was one of the greatest influences in the progress of the art of engraving."

== Drawings ==
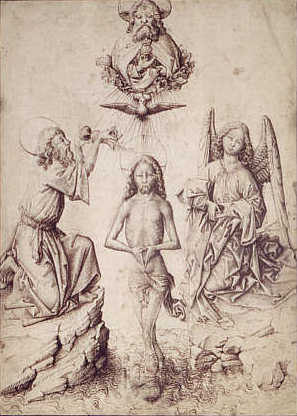
Baptism of Christ a drawing attributed to Master E. S., Louvre

Two very fine drawings, universally accepted as works by E. S., are in Berlin and the Louvre, but there are others which are disputed. The composition of the Baptism of Christ (picture at right), which is in the Louvre, was turned into two engravings by E. S., in doing which he complicated the compositions, filling empty spaces with new detail. Shestack considers that this reveals that his compositional method, here and perhaps commonly, was to begin by copying accurately a painting or other work by someone else. He then, in working on the engraving, introduced extra detail in a goldsmith's style.

== Ars Moriendi ==
He produced a series of eleven engravings for the Ars moriendi (The Art of Dying), a very popular devotional work. These were no doubt intended to be inserted into a manuscript copy of the book. The very controversial question of whether these were copies of woodcut versions of the same compositions in blockbooks was effectively solved in 1942, when Fritz Saxl published a set of manuscript illuminations using the same compositions found in the London library of the Wellcome Institute. These clearly predated all printed versions, all of which now can be seen to be derived from no doubt different versions of manuscript drawings in the same tradition. It has also been suggested that E. S. later designed the woodcuts for the earliest of the blockbooks, which are now seen as being created later than his engravings.

Engravings

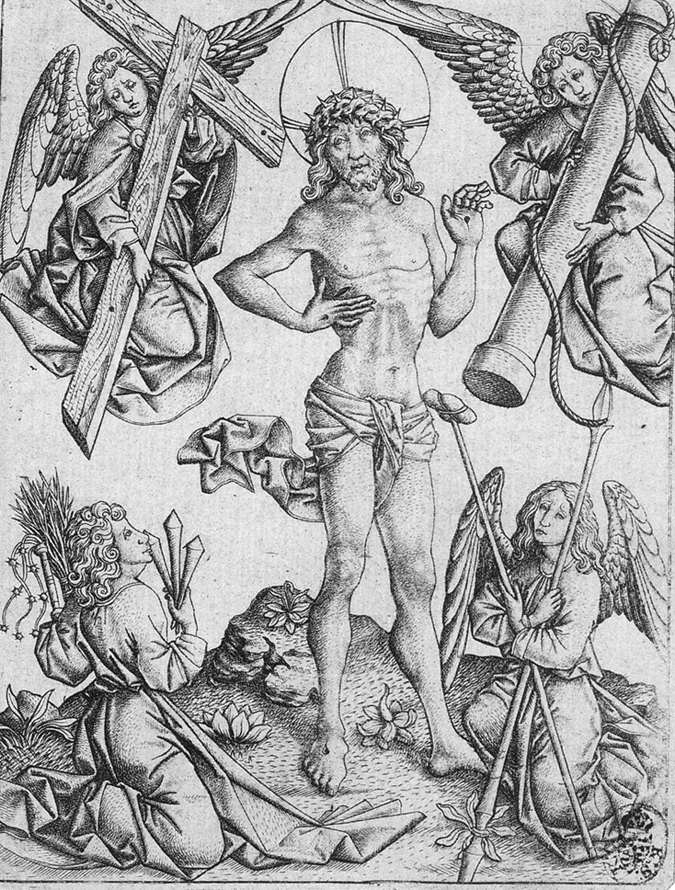
Christ as Man of Sorrows between Four Angels

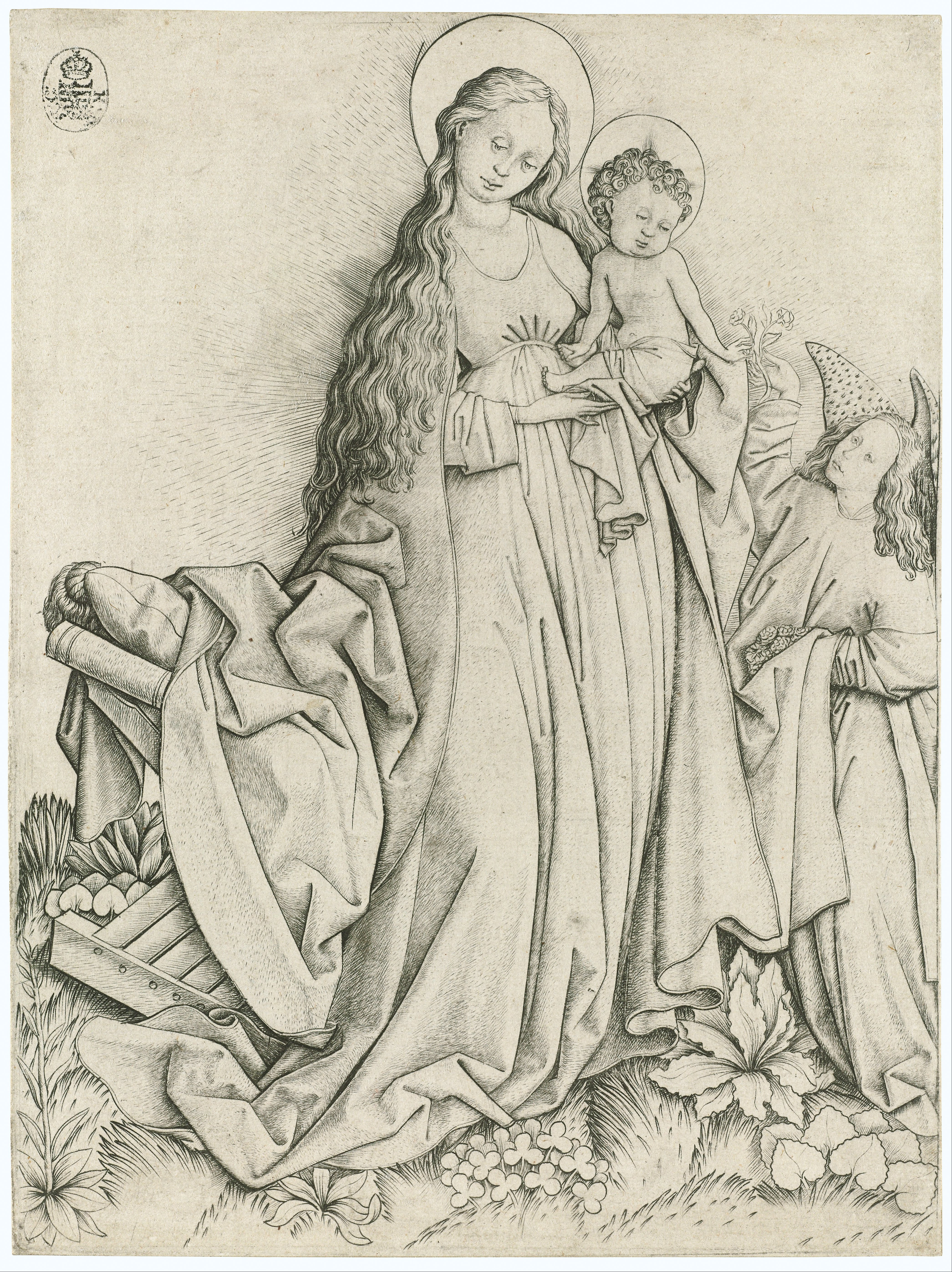
Madonna with Angel Giving Roses

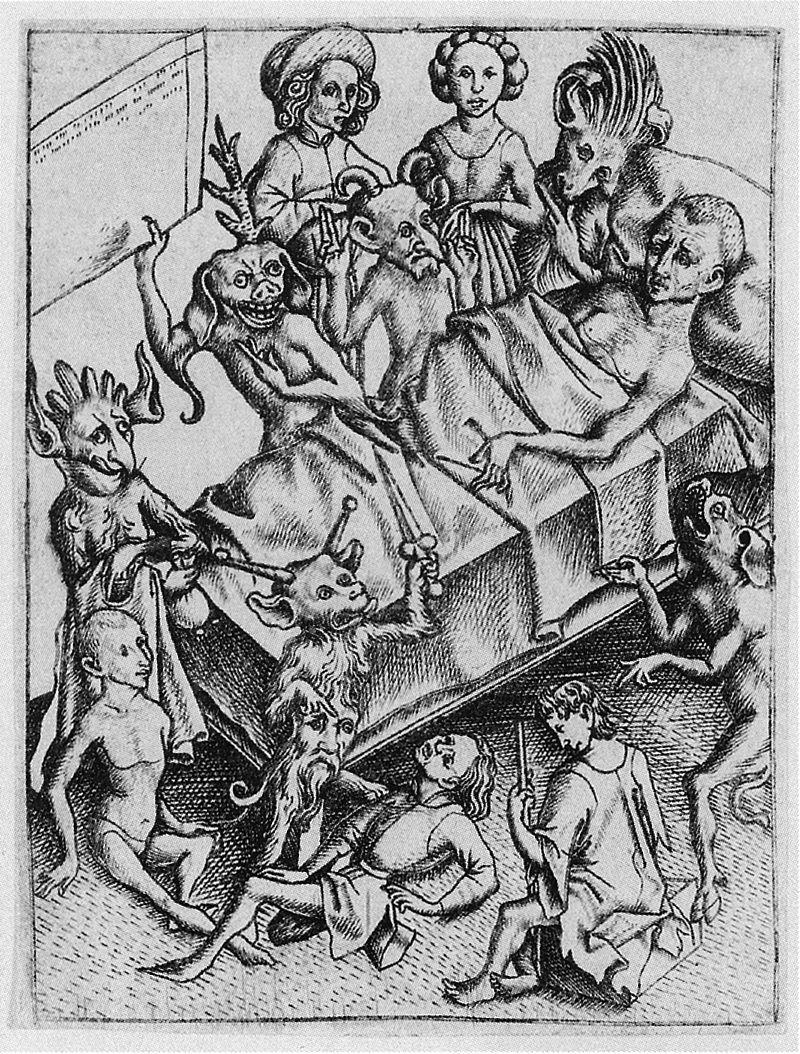
Temptation of Despair, from the Ars Moriendi series

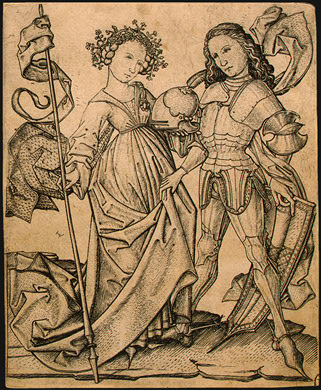
The Knight and the Lady

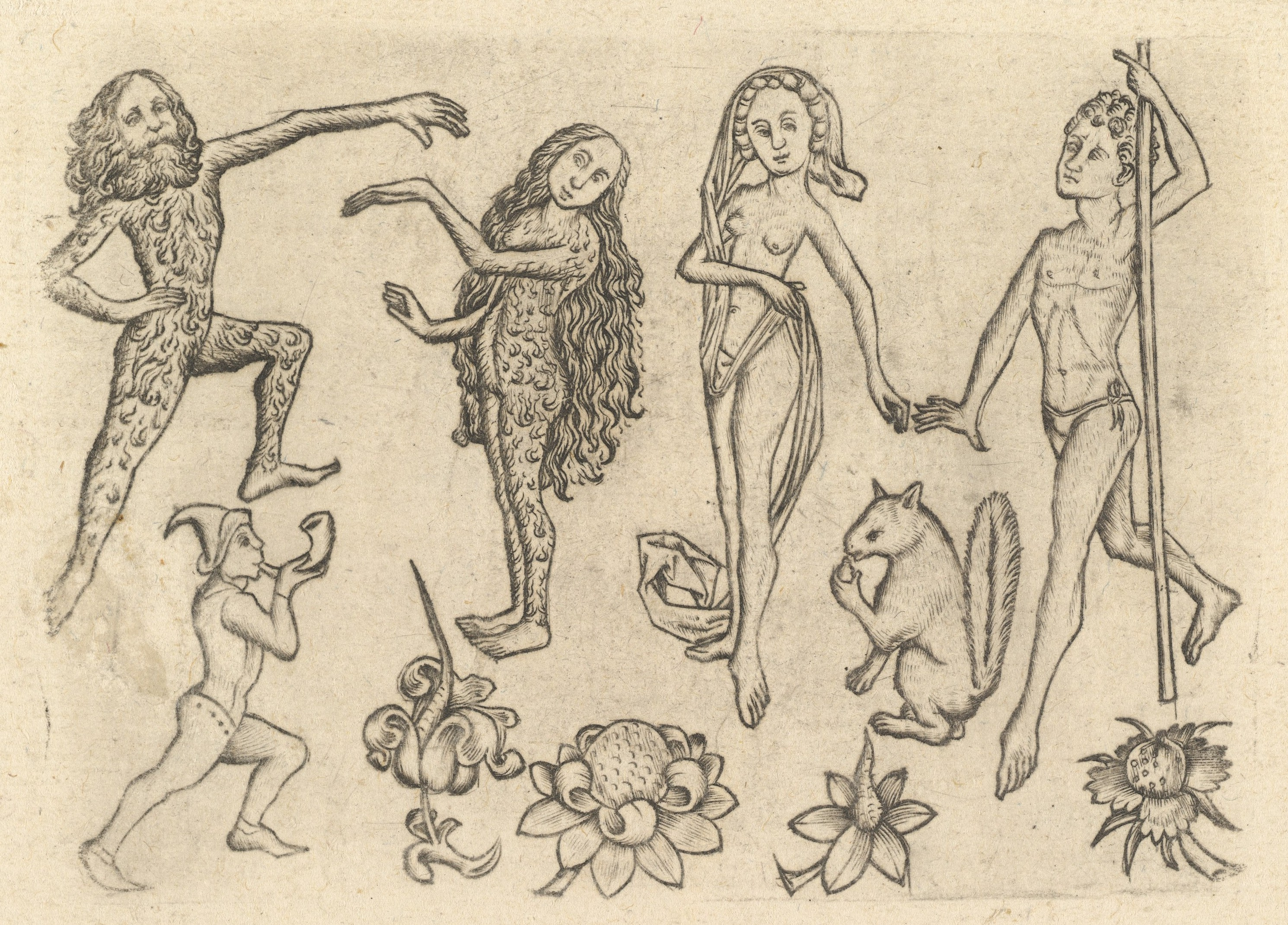
Designs for Goldsmiths

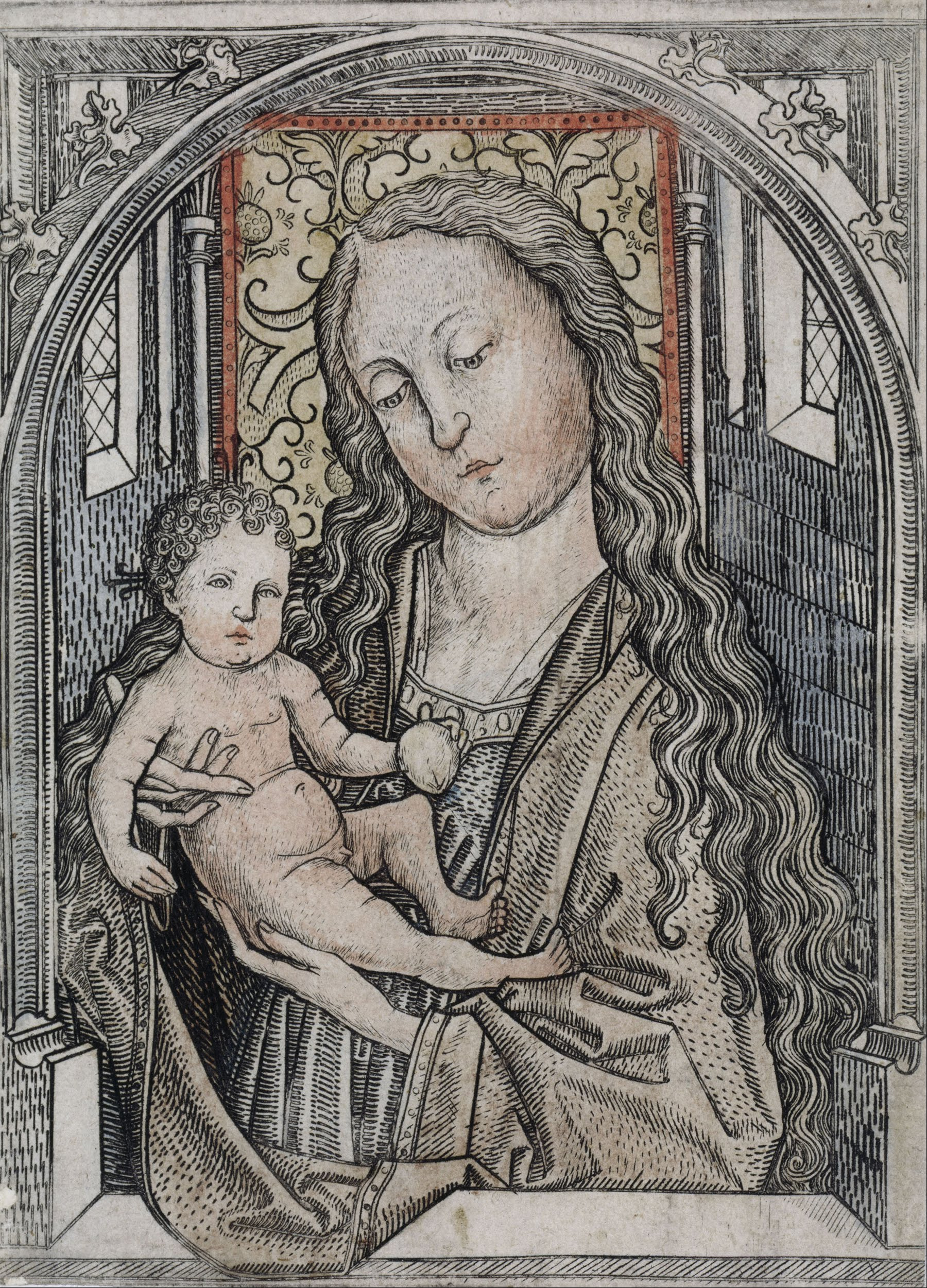
Madonna and Child, with later hand-colouring

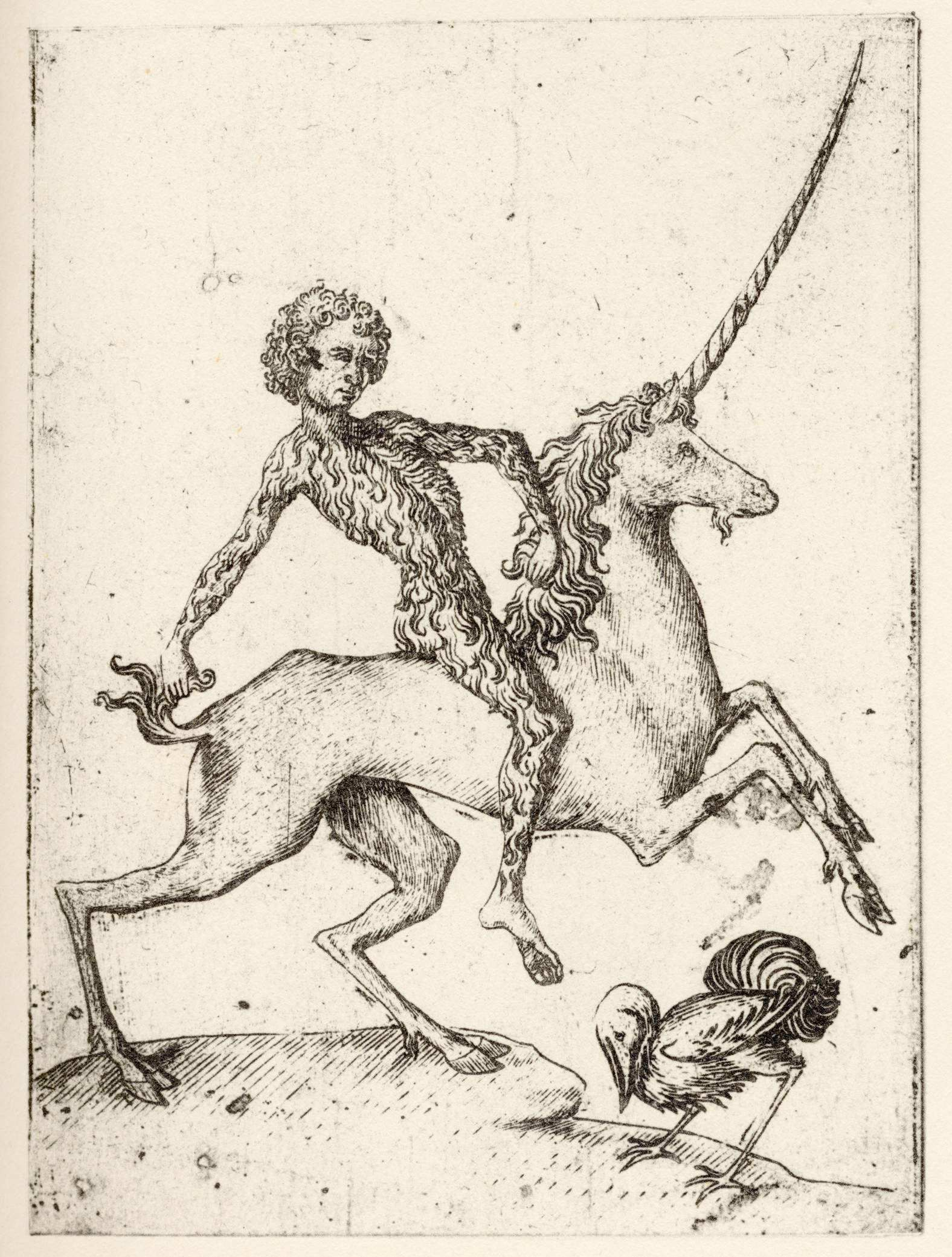
Playing-card: Jack of Birds
