= Otto prints =

15th-century engravings made in Florence

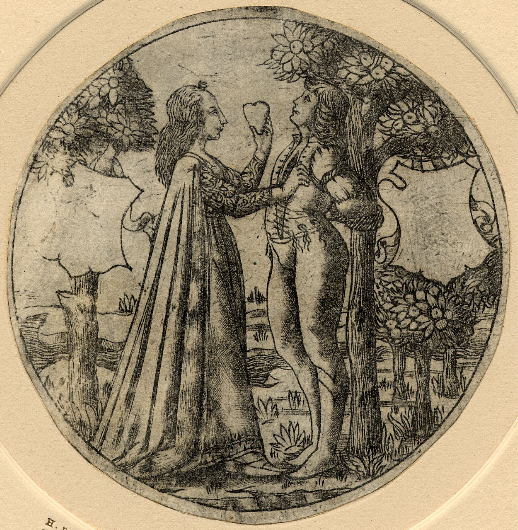
The Cruelty of Love, 101 mm across, with blank shields at sides. The man is tied to the tree and the woman has cut out his heart through a gash in his chest.

The Otto prints are a group of small 15th-century engravings made in Florence in the Fine Manner style. Between 24 and slightly over 40 prints are usually included in the group, depending on the scholar. Most are only known in a single surviving impression (copy), despite many showing clear signs of wear and reworking of the plate. They are often rather tentatively attributed to Baccio Baldini or his workshop, and dated to c. 1465–80. A few are "clearly by different hands" from the rest.

Unusually, they are all circular or oval, and their mostly secular subjects often feature themes of love, romance and courtship. Cherubs or putti feature in many, and there are some rather vague allegories. Many have elaborate borders of fruit, and sometimes figures. Hunting is another subject, and there are a few religious figures. They are probably designed to appeal to female tastes, unlike most secular art of the period, and "reveal a Renaissance voice husky from reveling". A. Hyatt Mayor remarked that "Florence, like Japan, has for centuries graced daily life with delightful trinkets".

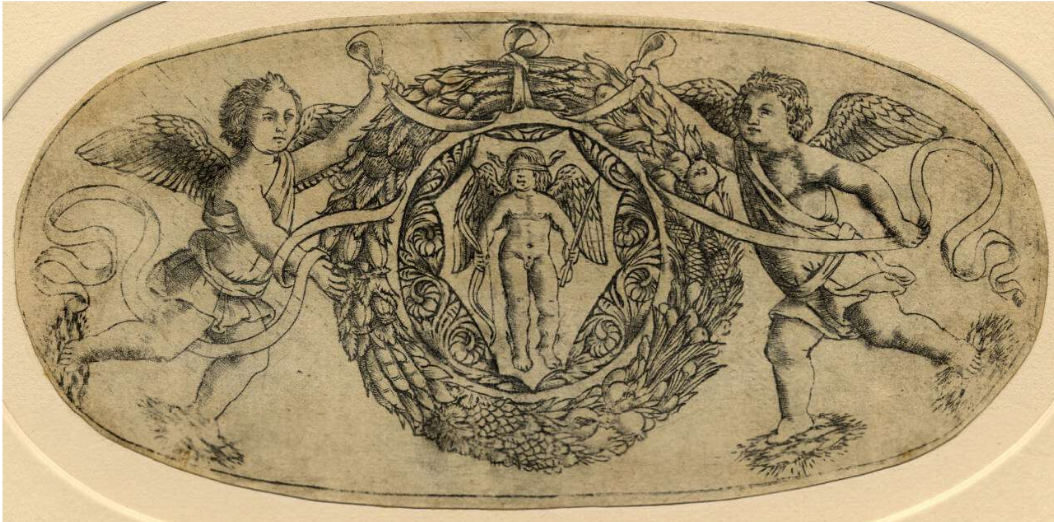
Two Cupids supporting a shield...with a blinded Cupid.

Most of the group, 24 prints, were part of the collections of "the infamous spy and antiquary" Baron Philipp von Stosch (1731–1757) and then Ernst Peter Otto (1724–1799), both Germans, after which the original group of 24 prints was auctioned and divided, with the British Museum buying the largest group. Scholars are mostly agreed that the surviving examples were from an album of samples held by a retailer, who sold them for use decorating the lids of other objects, "the covers of round or oblong toilet-boxes or work-boxes for ladies" as Hind puts it, or perhaps marriage caskets or small boxes of confectionery given as presents at weddings, betrothal ceremonies or the like, after which they might be reused by the recipient.

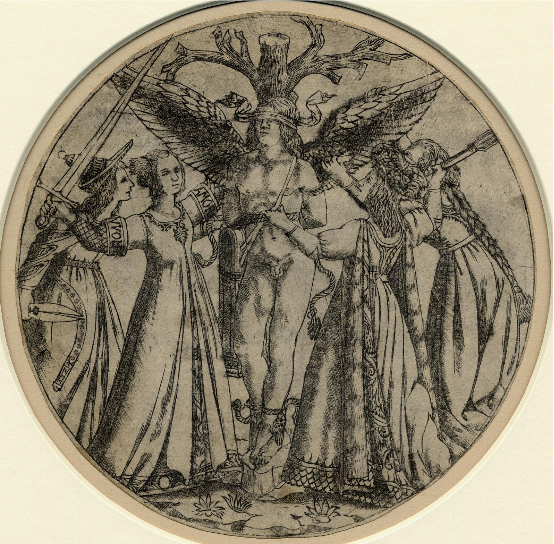
The Chastisement of Cupid, 165 mm across.

Many of the prints have one or two blank shields or other spaces for heraldry; in some of the examples coats of arms have been added in ink, which was evidently the intention. Those with two spaces suggest they were related to a marriage. The space for heraldry suggests these prints, which must have been expensive, were intended for elite customers. Several have elaborate "self-borders" of garlands and flowers in the latest Renaissance styles, suggesting that they may have been pasted to card and hung on a wall, and also possibly used as patterns by artisans in more permanent materials.

== Subjects ==
The typical subject matter includes pairs of lovers, putti and hunting dogs and their prey; "the prints share a certain thematic consistency found at the intersection between popular songs, pseudochivalric patrician culture, and love". Religious subjects, narrative rather than iconic, include a Tobias and the Angel and two versions of Judith Triumphant, brandishing the severed head of Holofernes. Some subjects show figures from classical mythology, including the legendary medieval story of Aristotle and Phyllis.

Both Judith and Phyllis were among the most common subjects in the Power of Women topos, showing famous women dominating or controlling men, and some of the Otto prints illustrate amor crudele or "the cruelty of Love", not entirely seriously. At least three show handsome male figures tied to a tree and being abused or menaced by women; two of the males are winged, and so considered as rather grown-up Cupids. The motif of the "chastisement" or torture of Cupid is found in various contexts in Italian art of the period; it is supposed to stand for the conquest of lust, but in these rather light-hearted images may represent the revenge of women who had suffered in love, as in the poetry of the Late Roman Ausonius.

Other types of secular Italian Renaissance art designed for female tastes are the marriage caskets made by the Embriachi workshop and others, and the painted desco da parto or "birthing tray". Connections have been made between the iconography of the prints and the trays, while the carved marriage caskets also often have blank shields for heraldry to be painted in.

== Style ==
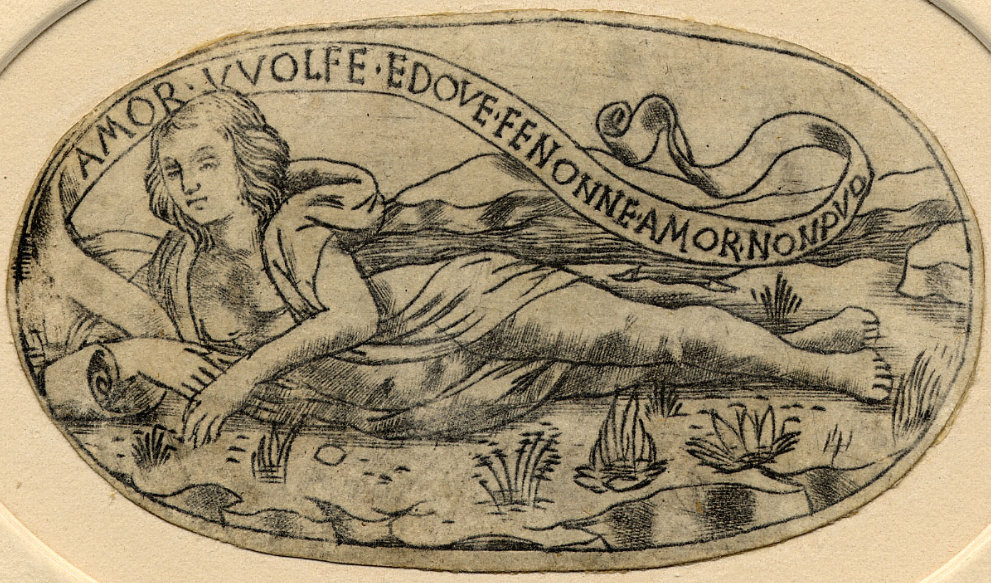
Reclining semi-naked nymph(?); the inscription "love desires loyalty, and where no loyalty is, neither is there love". Unique impression, 98 mm wide.

The Otto prints are leading exemplars of the "fine manner" in early Florentine engraving, distinguished from the "broad manner" initially by the width of the typical engraved line. The "fine manner" is associated with Baccio Baldini almost entirely on the word of Giorgio Vasari, who only arrived in Florence forty years after Baldini's death in 1487 (the date of his death is otherwise the only documentary information we have about Baldini).

The prints are "characterized by rather sharp, often deeply incised outlines; similar deeply-cut graver work for the features, for the ample ornament of the costumes, and for the architecture; and extremely fine lines, organized into rather fuzzy cross-hatching, for the shading".

== The group ==
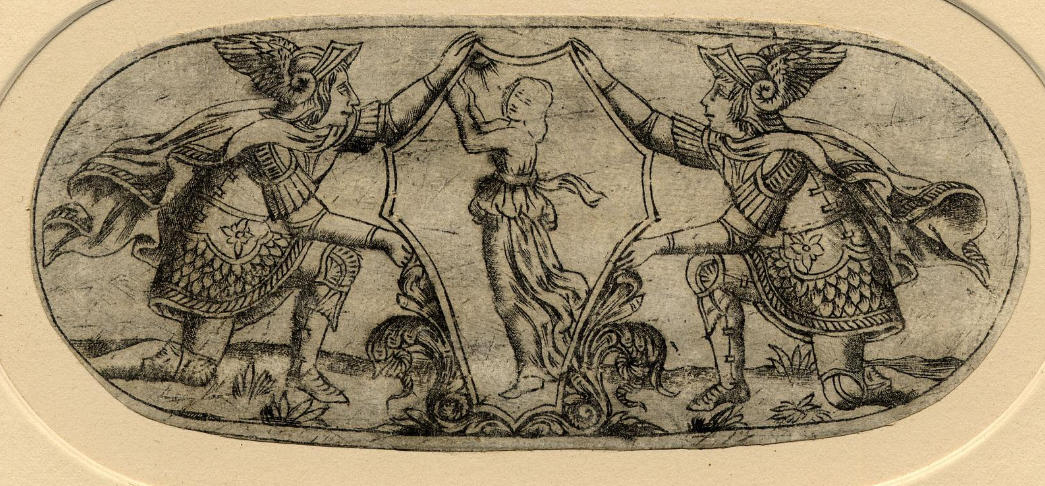
Two kneeling warriors supporting a shield decorated with a female figure..., perhaps Hope; 167 mm wide, unique impression.

Although many were printed in probably several hundred impressions, requiring the plates to be reworked, most only survive in a single impression as "prints pasted on the outside of boxes have almost always disappeared".

Le Peintre Graveur, the great catalogue of old master prints by Adam Bartsch, published between 1803 and 1821 in 21 volumes, catalogues in Volume XIII (pp. 142–151 in the Degen reprint), the 24 prints then in Otto's collection in Leipzig. Bartsch explains that he had personally only seen one of them, in another impression, which then as now is in the Albertina in Vienna, and he relied on information already published by another scholar, Michel Huber.

The British Museum curator and print historian Arthur Mayger Hind expanded the number of "Otto prints" from the 24 Otto had owned to 42 in his Catalogue of Early Italian Engravings in the British Museum (1910), adding similar examples in other collections. A small number of further additions have been made or claimed by later scholars.

== Provenance and collections ==
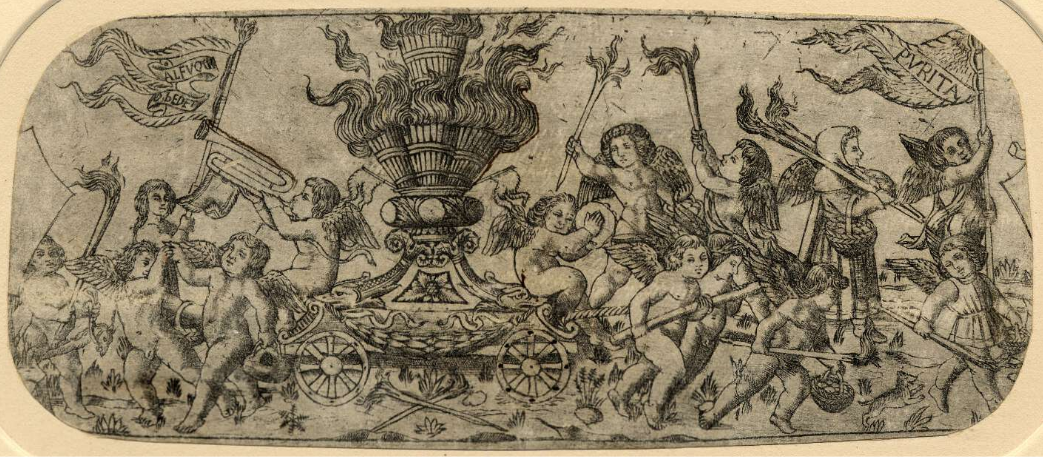
Bacchanal of putti.

The prints first surfaced when Baron Philip von Stosch bought them as a group of (at least) 24 in Florence in 1731. After his death in 1757 they were owned by Wilhelm Muzel, and then bought at auction by Ernst Peter Otto, still as a group of 24. He gave or sold 6 of them, leaving a group of 18. After his death these were sold at auction in Leipzig in 1852 by his heirs. Albert Evans of the London printsellers A E Evans & Sons was present, authorized to spend £150 on behalf of the British Museum. He used this to buy 6 of the Otto prints (now catalogued as BM 1852,0301.1 to 6), also buying a further 8 for his firm. These were later sold to the museum for £200 (now catalogued as BM 1852,0424.1 to 8), bringing their holding to 14 of Otto's original group of 24. The others went to various other buyers, and are now in several museums.

A further print, of Tobias and the Angel, was given by Otto to Pietro Zani and later entered the British Museum in 1866 as BM 1866,1013.900.

Some of the other prints were bought by the French Rothschild family and after the death of Baron Edmond de Rothschild given to the Louvre Museum, which has the largest holding after the British Museum. One, A Bear Attacked by Dogs in a Rocky Landscape, survives in three known impressions: Otto's impression in the British Museum, that in the Louvre, and a further one sold at auction for $27,500 in 2015.

The example in the British Museum has the two shields inked in, one with the Medici family arms of six balls (palle), a form not used by the family before 1465. This is often taken as indicating the start of the date range for the prints. Another unique print with this form of the Medici arms inked in reached the Harvard Museums in 1857.

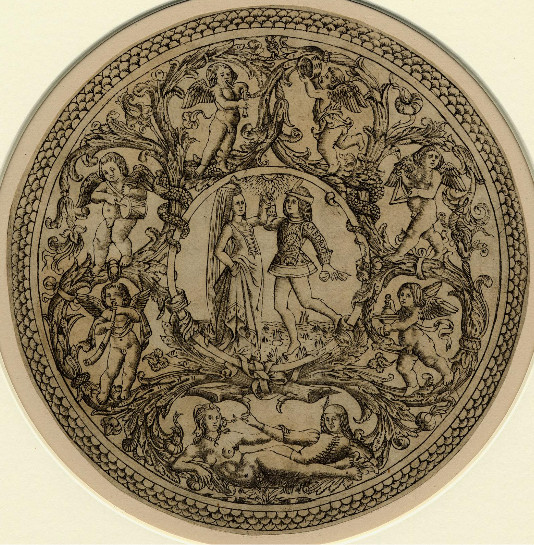
Pair of Lovers Dancing, with putti. BM 1852,0301.1, with another in the Louvre

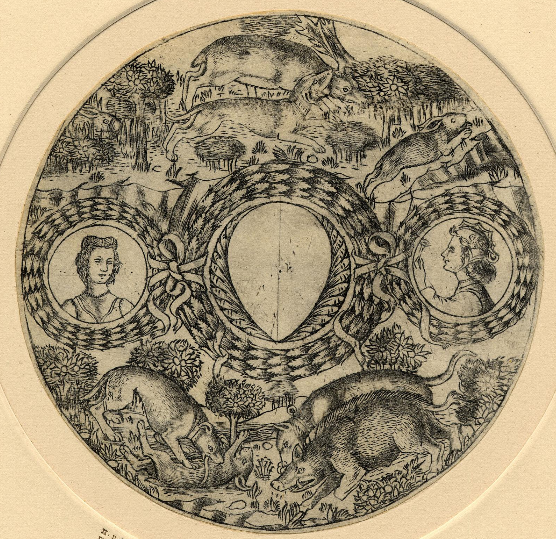
Busts of a couple, with dogs hunting. BM 1852,0424.5, with another in the Louvre

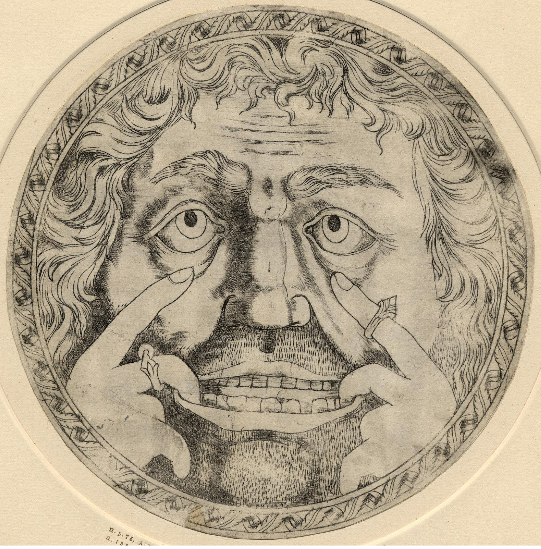
Grotesque male face, BM 1852,0424.4, unique impression

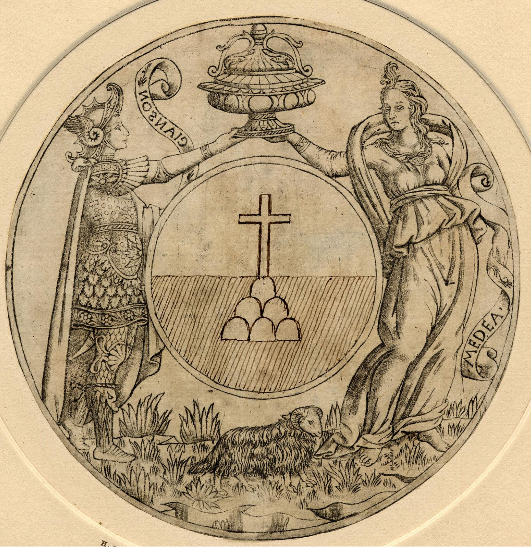
Jason and Medea, the Golden Fleece (still alive) at bottom. Inked-in coat-of arms, BM 1852,0301.4, unique
