= Maso Finiguerra =

Italian goldsmith, draftsman and engraver (1426–1464)

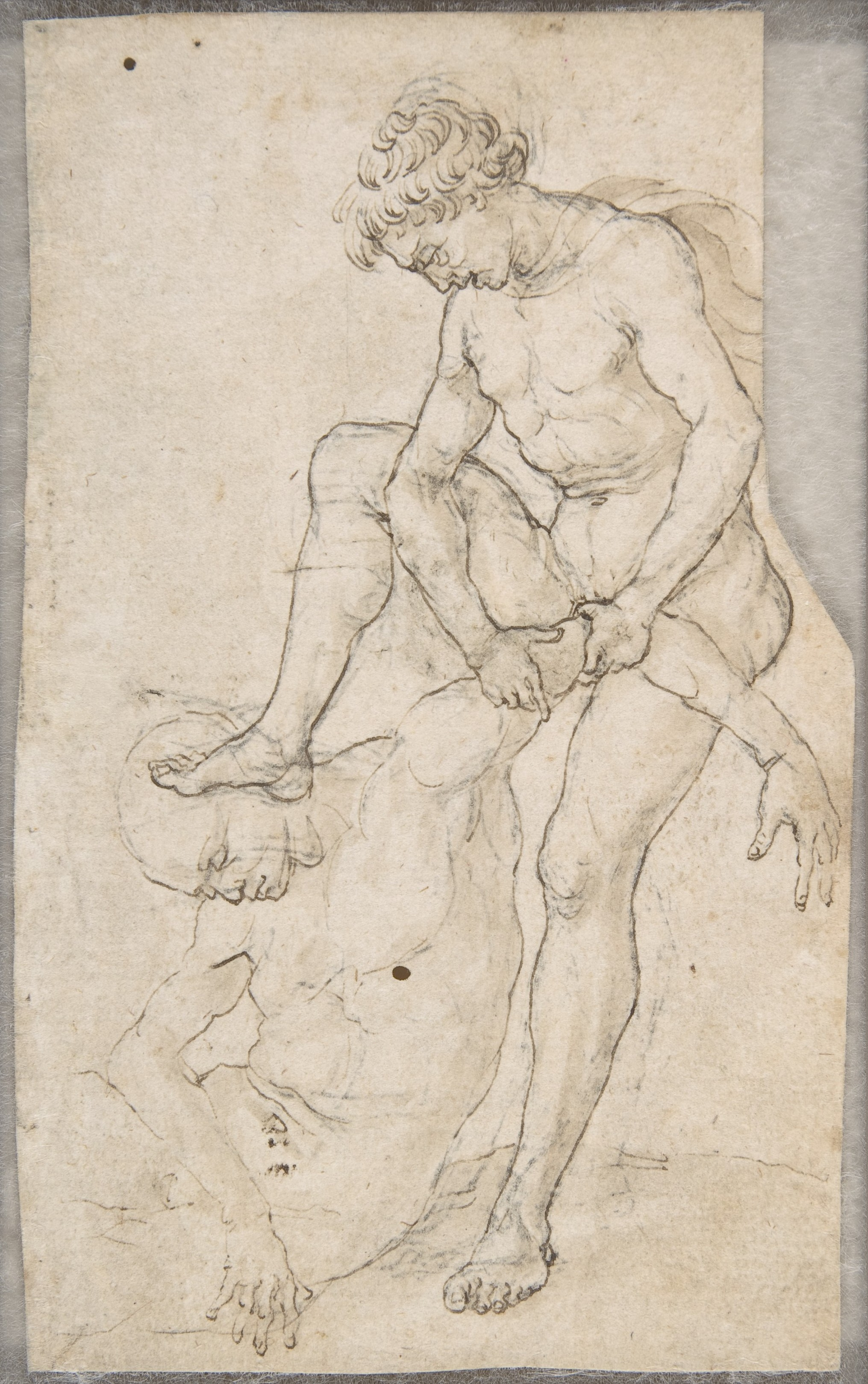
A Warrior Subduing Another, drawing

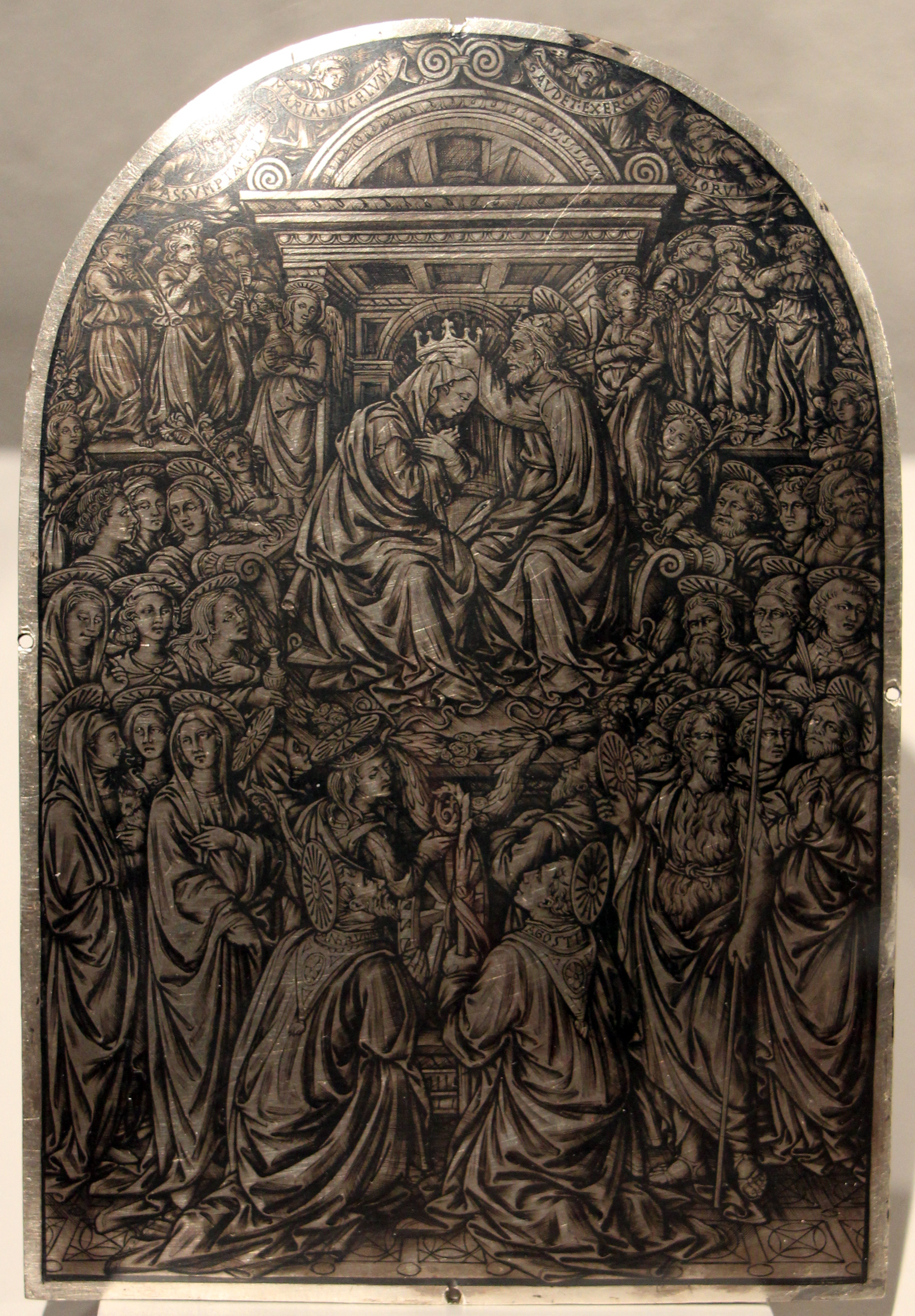
Coronation of the Virgin, niello, 1452, Bargello

Maso Tommasoii Finiguerra (1426–1464) was an Italian goldsmith, niellist, draftsman, and engraver working in Florence, who was incorrectly described by Giorgio Vasari as the inventor of engraving as a printmaking technique. This made him a crucial figure in the history of old master prints and remained widely believed until the early twentieth century. However, it was gradually realised that Vasari's view, like many of his assertions as to the origins of technical advances, could not be sustained. Typically, Vasari had overstated the importance of a fellow-Florentine, and a fellow-Italian, since it is now clear that engraving developed in Germany before Italy.

Vasari only ever credited him with paper impressions of his nielli, rather than engravings made from special printing-plates, in the usual sense of the word; in fact there probably never were any such engravings by him. Although he clearly was an important artist of his time, few surviving works, and no surviving prints, can now be definitely attributed to him, so scholarly interest in him has greatly reduced. Over 100 drawings in the Uffizi, and others elsewhere, remain attributed to him.

He died in his late thirties, and his influence lived after him in the works of the early Florentine engravers and drawings related to them, especially the shadowy figure of Baccio Baldini, who Vasari associates with him.

== Career ==
He was the son of Antonio, and grandson of Tommaso Finiguerra or Finiguerri, both goldsmiths of Florence, and was born in Santa Lucia d'Ognissanti in 1426. He worked with his family as a goldsmith and was early distinguished for his work in niello. In 1449, there is a note of a sulfur cast from a niello of his workmanship being handed over by the painter Alessio Baldovinetti to a customer in payment or exchange for a dagger. In 1452 Maso delivered and was paid for a niellated silver pax commissioned for the Florence Baptistery by the Arte di Calimala or cloth merchant's guild.

By 1457 he had left his father's workshop and partnered with the goldsmith Piero di Bartolommeo di Sail, who worked with Antonio del Pollaiuolo, when the firm had an order for a pair of silver candlesticks for the church of San Jacopo at Pistoia. In 1459 in the Palazzo Rucellai, artworks by Finiguerra are annotated as belonging to Giovanni Rucellai. In 1462 he is recorded as having supplied another wealthy Florentine, Cino di Filippo Rinuccini, with waist buckles, and in the years next following with forks and spoons for christening presents. In 1463 he drew cartoons, the heads of which were colored by Alessio Baldovinetti, for five or more figures for the sacristy of Florence Cathedral, which was being decorated in intarsia or wood inlay by a group of artists with Giuliano da Maiano at their head. On 4 December 1464 Maso Finiguerra made his will, and died shortly afterwards.

== Surviving works ==
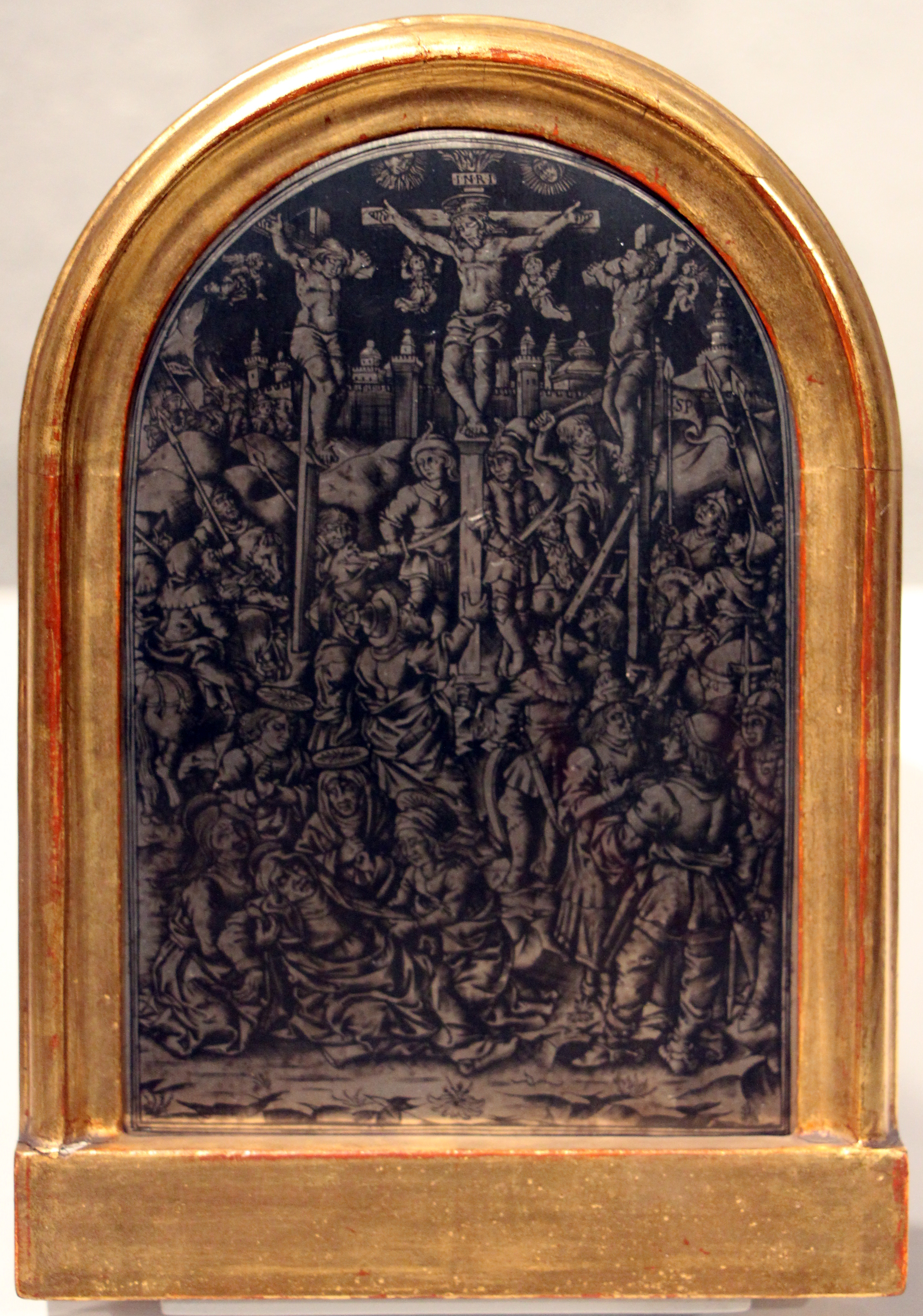
Niello pax with the Crucifixion, Bargello

The only fully documented works by Finiguerra which survive are the intarsia figures for the cathedral, over half life-size, executed from his cartoons for the sacristy. But these seems so fully in the style of Antonio del Pollaiuolo that Konrad Oberhauser thought it "extremely doubtful" that he actually designed them himself. But he is thought to be responsible for a number of other works: a few nielli, and sulphur casts from them and others, and over a hundred drawings.

=== Drawings ===
Much the largest group of drawings is in the Uffizi, some of which are inscribed "Maso Finiguerra" in a seventeenth-century writing, probably by Filippo Baldinucci, curator of the Medici collections. These depict many figures of the studio and the street, to all appearance members of the artists own family and workshop, drawn direct from life, and used "as a repository of figural ideas that could be used by Finiguerra to speed up the compositional process". The Uffizi group includes 14 studies of birds and animals, some apparently copied from other drawings, such as a rather stylized cockerel.

There are two large drawings on vellum (both 28 x 41 cm, plus change) which show scenes from the Old Testament and are crowded with figures. These are Moses on Mount Sinai, and the Brazen Serpent below in the British Museum, and The Flood in the Kunsthalle, Hamburg. These were apparently intended as finished artworks, though both were later copied as engravings by Francesco Rosselli.

The drawings can be dated from their style and the contemporary costumes to the 1450s up to Finiguerra's death in 1464. They agree strictly with the accounts of Finiguerra's drawings left us by Vasari and Baldinucci, and disagree in no respect with the character of the inlaid figures of the sacristy. That he was probably also an engraver in niello appears from the fact that figures from the Uflizi series of drawings are repeated among the rare anonymous Florentine niello prints of the time (the chief collection of which, formerly belonging to the marquis of Salamanca, is now in Edmond de Rothschild Collection at the Louvre).

The Florentine Picture-Chronicle was attributed to Finiguerra when first published in 1893, by Sidney Colvin, but is now more often attributed to Baccio Baldini, or an artist of his circle. This album is an unusual and ambitious attempt at a "pictorial chronicle of the world", which was never completed. The drawings are in black chalk, then ink and usually wash.

=== Nielli and casts ===
The attribution of a group of nielli, in particular some in the Bargello, is complicated by problems arising from the matching up of documentary records, and the remarks of Vasari and Benvenuto Cellini, with the surviving works. As mentioned above, in 1452 Maso made a niello silver pax for the Florence Baptistery, commissioned by the Arte di Calimala. In 1455 the guild ordered a second pax from another goldsmith, Matteo Dei. The subject of neither piece is known from the records. Two paxes with matching frames in the Bargello museum are thought to come from the baptistry, but their styles are considered too different to be by the same artist. One, of the Coronation of the Virgin is generally thought superior in quality and assigned to Finiguerra. The other shows a Crucifixion, and is often thought to be Dei's piece of 1456.

The problem arises because Cellini praises a pax by Finiguerra with a Crucifixion scene with horses, and Vasari praises one with scenes of the Passion of Christ. Other surviving paxes are enlisted to match these descriptions, while still forming a group with a sufficiently consistent style. Some of the nielli have surviving sulphur casts, which might strengthen the association with Finiguerra.

== Legacy ==
These documented facts are supplemented by several writers. By his contemporaries he is praised for niellos by the Florentine Filarete and the Bolognese poet A.M. Salimbeni. In the generations following Baccio Bandinelli said Finiguerra was among the young artists under Lorenzo Ghiberti working on the famous gates of the Baptistery, Florence; Benvenuto Cellini said he was the finest master of his day in niello engraving, and that his masterpiece was a pax of the Crucifixion in the baptistery of St. John; that being no great draftsman, he in most cases, including that of the above-mentioned pax, worked from drawings by Antonio del Pollaiuolo.

Vasari, on the other hand, though saying that Finiguerra was an inferior draughtsman to Pollaiuolo, mentions a number of original drawings by him as existing in Vasari's own collection, with figures both draped and nude, and histories drawn in watercolor. Vasari's account was confirmed and amplified in the next century by Baldinucci, who says that he has seen many drawings by Finiguerra in the manner of Masaccio; adding that Maso was beaten by Pollaiuolo in competition for the reliefs of the great silver altar-table commission by the merchants guild for the baptistery of St. John (this famous work is now preserved in the Opera del Duomo).

== Zani's claims ==
In the last years of the 18th century, Vasari's account of Finiguerra's invention was held to have received a decisive and startling confirmation under the following circumstances. There was in the Baptistery at Florence (now in the Bargello) a beautiful 15th-century niello pax of the Coronation of the Virgin. The Abate Gori, a connoisseur of the mid-century, had claimed this conjecturally for the work of Finiguerra; a later and still more enthusiastic virtuoso, the Abate Zani, discovered first, in the collection of Count Seratti at Ligorno, a sulfur cast from the very same niello (cast now in the British Museum), and then, in the Bibliothèque nationale de France, Paris, a paper impression corresponding to both. Here, then, he proclaimed, was the actual material first fruit of Finiguerra's invention and proof positive of Vasari's accuracy.

Zani's famous discovery is now discredited among serious students. For one, the art of printing from engraved copperplates had been known in Germany and in Italy for years prior to the date of Finiguerra's alleged invention. For another, Finiguerra's pax for the baptistery, if Cellini is to be trusted, represented not a Coronation of the Virgin but a Crucifixion. In the next place, its recorded weight does not at all agree with that of the pax claimed by Gori and Zani to be his. Again, and perhaps this is the strongest argument of any, all authentic records agree in representing Finiguerra as a close associate in art and business of Antonio del Pollaiuolo. Now nothing is more marked than the special style of Pollaiuolo and his group; and nothing is more unlike it than the style of the Coronation pax, the designer of which must obviously have been trained in quite a different school, namely that of Filippo Lippi.
