= Arthur Mayger Hind =

British art historian and curator

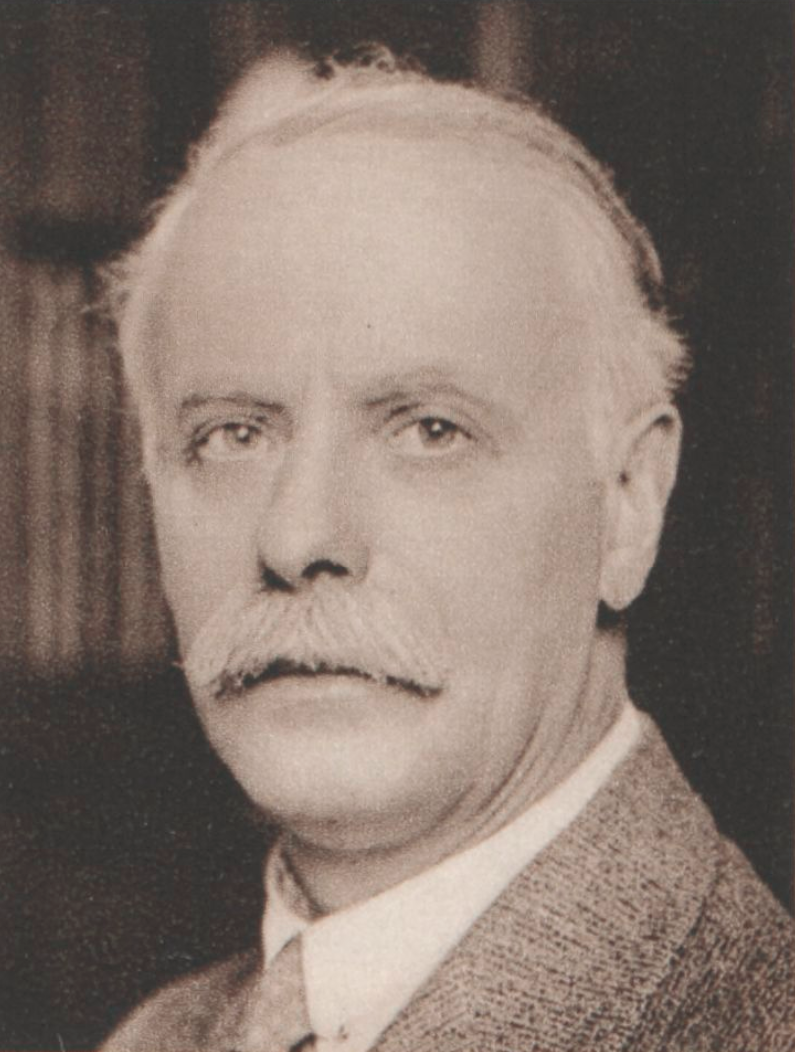
Arthur Mayger Hind

Arthur Mayger Hind (1880–1957) was a British art historian and curator, who usually published as Arthur M. Hind or A. M. Hind. He specialized in old master prints, and was Keeper of the Department of Prints and Drawings at the British Museum until he retired in 1945.

Many prints continue to be referred to by the numbers from his catalogue of Italian engravings in the British Museum, a work begun in 1910 and published in expanded form in four volumes in 1948, with another three in 1948. His classic introductory books A [Short] History of Engraving and Etching (1908) and An Introduction to a History of Woodcut (1935) continued to be reprinted for decades by Dover Publications. The former was described by a later curator as "perhaps the most influential general guide ever written to the history of printmaking".

With Campbell Dodgson, his predecessor as Keeper, he participated in the "heated atmosphere of rumour and anticipation" (as Dodgson put it in 1927) around the major sales of first half of the century, many dispersing German aristocratic collections, with Berlin, Munich and Americans the main competitors.

== Biography ==
Born in Burton upon Trent, Hind attended City of London School and Emmanuel College, Cambridge. He graduated from university with honours in 1902. Hind came to specialise in prints and drawings and studied the history of engraving in Dresden under Max Lehrs for a year before joining the British Museum in 1904. His particular interest lay in Italian prints and drawings. Between 1933 and 1945 he was Keeper of the Department of Prints, British Museum. He died in Henley-on-Thames in 1957.
