= Lynton McKenzie =

American firearms engraver

Lynton McKenzie (December 21, 1940–February 9, 1999) was an Australian-born American engraver. McKenzie engraved for heads of state all over the world and worked on some of the world's most valuable antique firearms.

== Biography ==
McKenzie was born in Rockhampton, Central Queensland, Australia, on December 21, 1940. He became interested in gunsmithing at age eleven, and engraving at fourteen. By his late teens, McKenzie was considered Australia's leading gunsmith.

McKenzie travelled to Europe carrying letters of introduction from the premier and prime minister of Australia, allowing him to study engraved firearms from museums and private collections. He studied engraving with masters in Belgium and Italy, and spent six years in London where he engraved double rifles and shotguns for firms such as Holland & Holland, Purdey and Sons, and Rigby. He restored antique European firearms for museums, wealthy collectors, the Tower of London, and the Queen's Collection. The last major firearm that McKenzie restored was a 1652 Louis XIV, built at the Royal Armory in Lyon, France.

In 1980, McKenzie moved to Tucson, Arizona in the United States. He decorated two of five rifles for the Safari Club International's Big Five Classic Masterpiece Collection. The guns were built by the Tucson-based David Miller Co. The first gun, commemorating the elephant, sold for $41,000 in 1982, and the fifth gun, commemorating the leopard, sold for $201,000 in 1986.

McKenzie's work was respected worldwide. He engraved items for the Sultan of Brunei, the Saudi royal family, and British heads of state. According to Bill Quimby, director of publications for Safari Club International, McKenzie was one of the two top engravers in the world (along with engraver Winston Churchill).
