= Alardo de Popma =

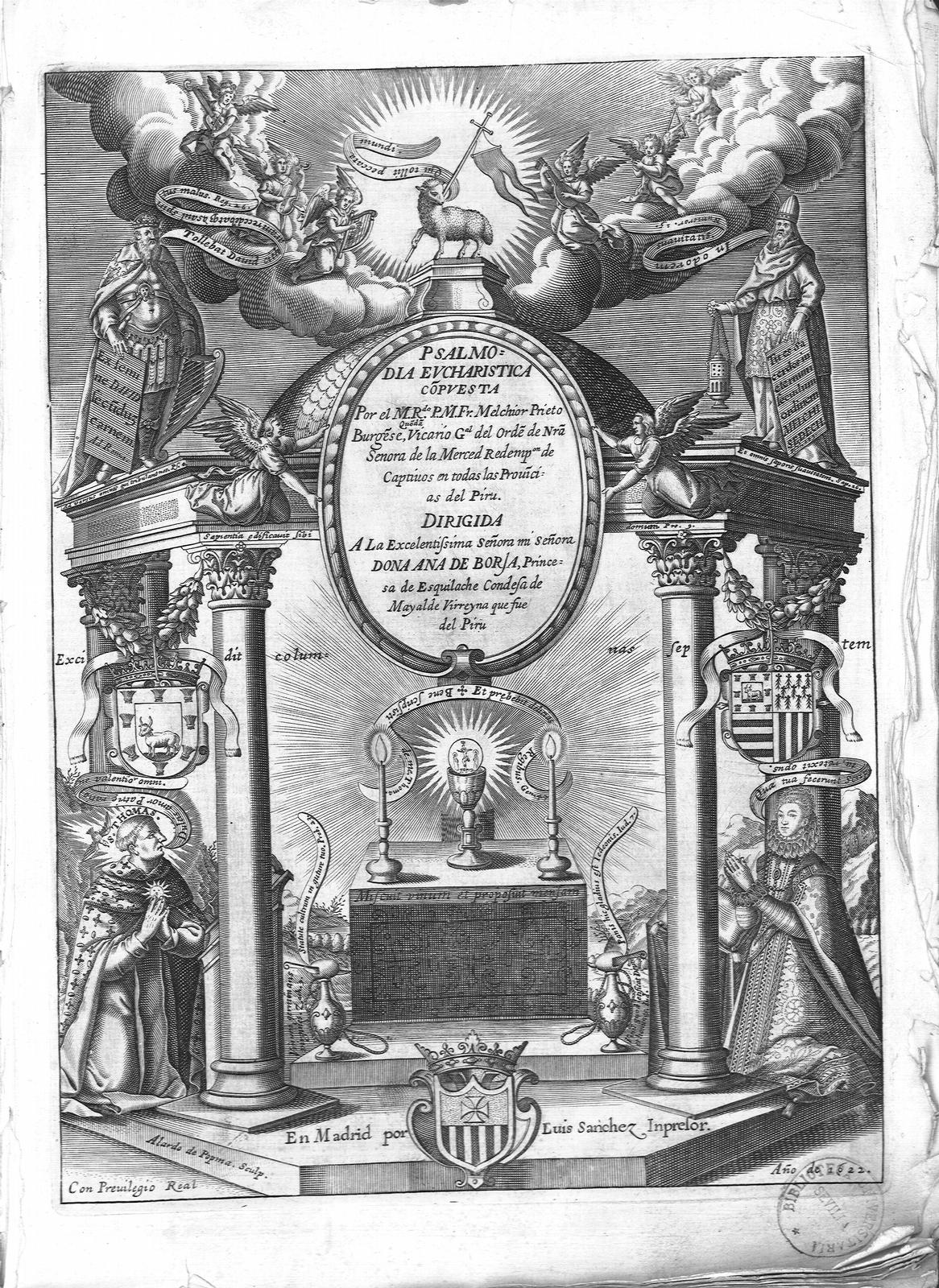
Engraving by Melchor Prieto and Alardo Popma, 1622

Alardo de Popma (before 1617–1641) was a Flemish engraver, who worked in Madrid in the early seventeenth century, according to the earliest references to his works. His copperplate engravings include title-pages, frontispieces and portraits, which are characterized by an exceptionally clean and confident line.

His is known to have lived in Seville for a time, perhaps in order to undertake a commission there.

== Works ==
In 1616 he produced the engravings for the Cronicón de la excelentísima casa de los Ponce de León, published in 1620. He executed the title-page for the Comentario sobre las palabras de Nuestra Señora, que se hallan en el Evangelio by Fr. Pedro de Abreu in 1617. In 1621 he worked with Jan de Courbes to produce a work commissioned by the Order of Merced that included fifteen copper plates. In 1624, he engraved the title-page of Pedro Fernández de Navarrete's Conservación de las Monarquías y Discursos políticos (Madrid, 1626) and later the title-page for the Historia de las Ordenes Militares de Santiago, Calatrava y Alcantara (Madrid, 1629), by Francisco Caro de Torres, as well as the frontispiece for the Obras de San Juan de la Cruz (1630), commissioned by the widow of Pedro Madrigal. Other works include his contributions to El glorioso doctor San Ildefonso by Salazar de Mendoza (Toledo, c. 1618) and to El embajador by Juan de Vera y Zúñiga (1620). The latter is one of his most renowned works, because of the clarity of the line and the play of light.
