= Geoffroy Gournet =

Geoffroy Gournet is a European-trained master engraver. He was born in France and moved the United States in 1985. In 1987 he became the official and sole engraver at Parker Reproductions, engraving the A1 Special.

== Training ==
Geoffroy Gournet began his training in Belgium. He attended the Belgian School of Gunsmithing in Liège, where he was awarded The First Prize of Basculage (Gunsmithing) for his work. He learned the techniques of gunsmithing under the guidance of Ernest Dumoulin. He also earned the First prize at Liège's School of Engraving.

From Belgium he continued his training in Gardone Val Trompia where he spent time in different workshops with such masters as Ceasare Giovanelli and Gianfranco Pedersoli. During his stay in Italy he met the Master Julio Timpini, from Beretta, Giacomo Fausti and Giovanni Steduto both now of Creative Art. Geoffroy Gournet was so eager to master all the techniques of bulino that he spent 7 days a week practicing. Phil Coggan and Gary Merle were also students there at the same time as Geoffroy.

== Career ==
Once Geoffroy Gournet had mastered engraving he moved to Virginia to be an artist-in-residence. In 1987, Geoffroy met Tom Skeuse Sr. the father of “Parker Reproduction”. Geoffroy became the sole and full-time engraver at Parker Reproduction. He worked exclusively on the A1 Special shotguns creating one of a kind masterpieces. He embellished the A1 Special shotguns with everything from English scrolls to gold inlay to theater masks to farms scenes to wonderfully detailed hunting scenes. He worked for the New Jersey–based company from 1987 until 2002.

Since 2002, he has dedicated himself entirely to private customers; engraving shotguns, knives, jewelry, and other engravables. He lives in Easton, Pennsylvania, an hour and a half from New York City, roughly 65 miles.
