= Luigi Antoldi =

Italian engraver

Luigi Antoldi (Mantua, born 26/06/1794 - Mantua, died 1878) was an Italian engraver.

== Biography ==
He is known for having made many lithographic prints of antique paintings. In 1838, he published a book on prints by Andrea Mantegna. His lithographic portrait of Giulia Contessa Magnaguti married to Gerardi di Pietrapiana is presently in Lombardy.

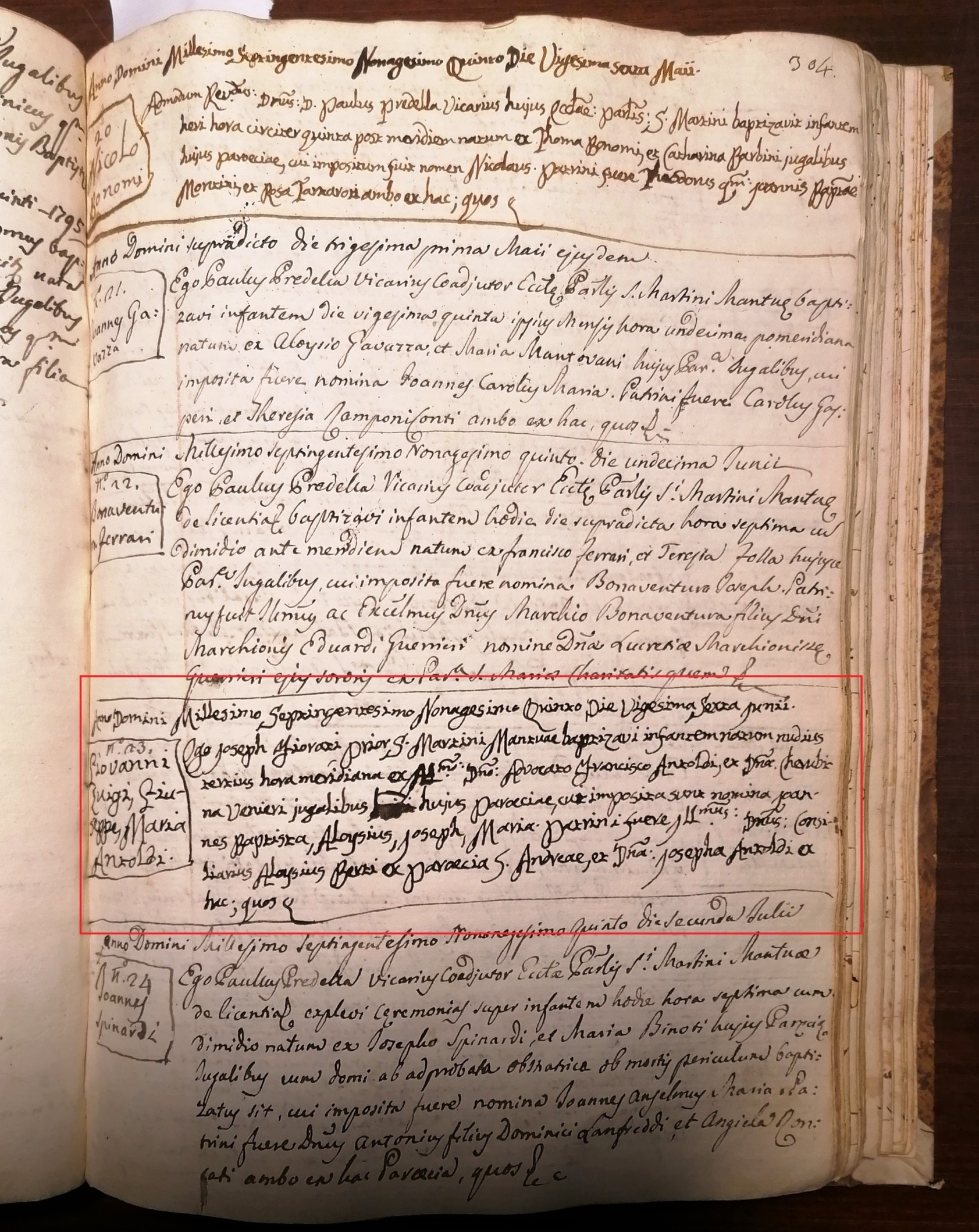
Luigi Antoldi, baptismal certificate at the parish of San Martino, Sheet No. 304, Act No. 23 of June 26, 1794.

His place and date of birth, long uncertain, were recently found recorded in the 'Book of Baptisms' (year 1794) of the parish of San Martino (Mantua), on the Sheet No. 304, Act No. 23, dated June 26, 1794. This document is kept in the Diocesan Archives of Mantua, document which also specifies that his father was the lawyer Francesco Antoldi, who in 1817 published in Mantua the "Guida pel forestiere che brama di conoscere le più pregevole opere di belle arti nella città di Mantova" (Guide for the foreigner who desires to know the most valuable works of fine art in the city of Mantua).
