= Paul Angiers =

English engraver

Paul Angiers (fl. 1749), was an English engraver, of whom little is known. He was in London about 1749, and was taught by John Tinney. He was chiefly employed by the booksellers, and etched some neat plates. According to Heineken he died when about thirty. His best plates are Roman Ruins, after Pannini, 1749; a landscape after Moucheron, 1755: and Dead Game, after Huet, 1757.
