= Ghisi Shield =

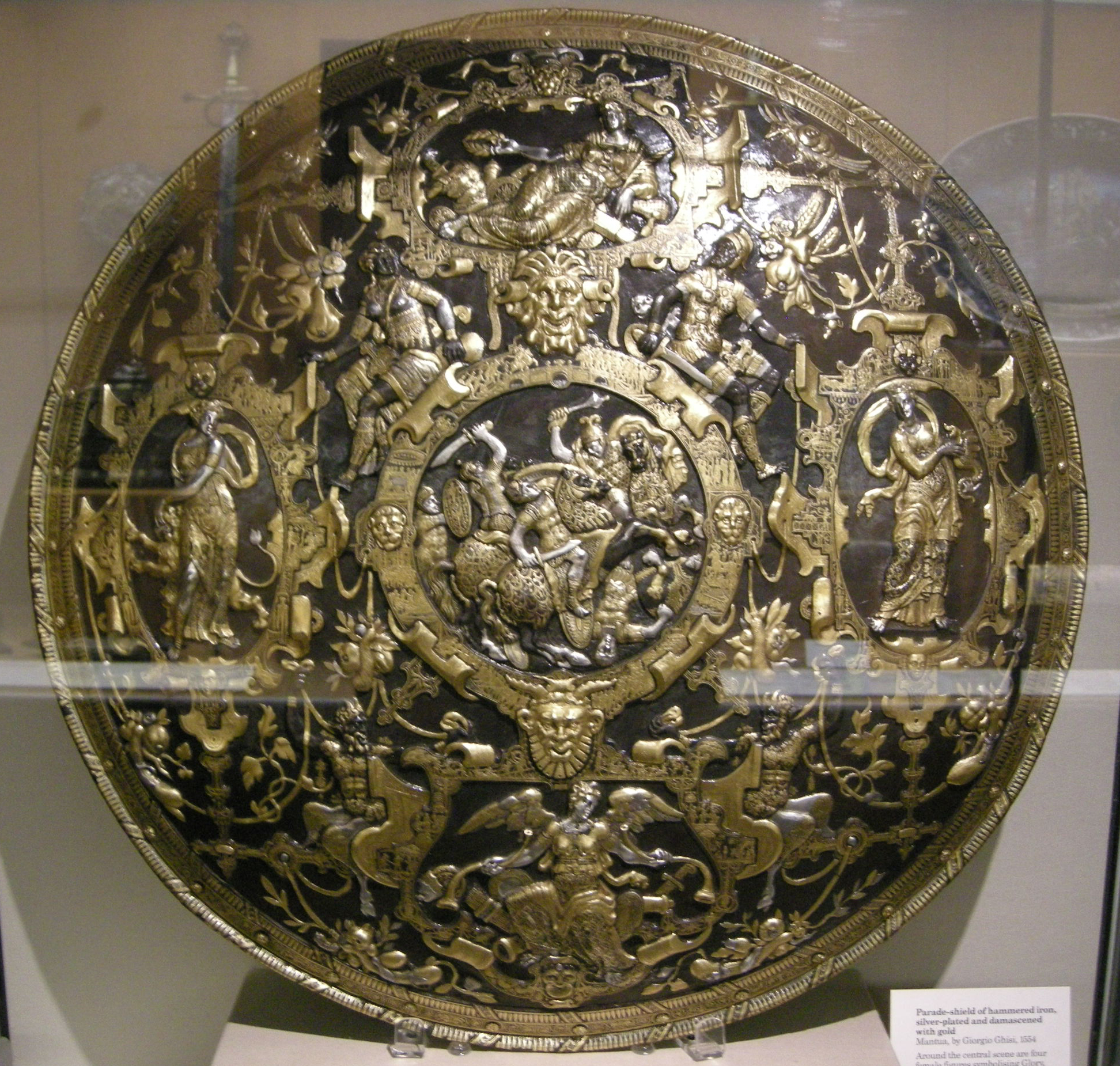
The Ghisi Shield, Waddesdon Bequest, British Museum, London

The Ghisi Shield is a piece of Renaissance parade armour made by the Italian goldsmith and engraver Giorgio Ghisi, signed and dated 1554. It is part of the Waddesdon Bequest, held by the British Museum in London since 1898.

The shield is made from a single plate of hammered steel, with its rim turned over a wire. The decoration on the outer face is damascened in gold and partially plated with silver. It is 55.8 centimetres (22.0 in) in diameter, 7 centimetres (2.8 in) deep, and weighs 3.8 kilograms (8.4 lb). An inscription on the front of the shield reads, "GEORGIVS DE GHISYS MNTVANZ FA M.D.LIIII".

Ghisi was an artist, mainly a printmaker, from Mantua, but he was in the Netherlands from about 1550 to about 1555, and the shield was probably made in Antwerp, then under the rule of the Habsburgs. It is one of only two surviving pieces of damascened metalwork known to have been made by Ghisi. (The other item is a damaged sword hilt, dated 1570, and now in the Hungarian National Museum in Budapest.)

The intricately decorated shield, damascened with gold and silver, was intended for display, not for use in battle. It is embossed with repoussé and chased work in high relief, with a framed central circular scene of battling horseman, surrounded by four strapwork cartouches containing allegorical female figures (Victory, Fame, Fortitude, Prudence). The frames around the five main scenes themselves incorporate detailed images on a much smaller scale, taken from the Iliad and ancient mythology, inlaid in gold. Further imagery of birds, foliage, putti, satyrs and other figures, fills the field between the frames.

The shield may have been designed by a Netherlandish artist, not Ghisi himself: other shields made in the Netherlands in the late 16th century have survived with similar decoration, but none of them demonstrate the accomplished decorative skills of Ghisi. For example, an iron shield held by the Kunsthistorisches Museum in Vienna has similar strapwork and embossed imagery with scenes of Jason and the Golden Fleece; and a similar gilded shield or rondache at the Hermitage in St Petersburg has four allegorical figures (Prudence, Fortitude, Fame, Envy) arranged in circular cartouches around a circular image of Mars.

The Ghisi Shield was sold for £1,000 at the Allègre sale in Paris in 1863, and then sold in the sale of the Demidov Collection in Paris in 1870, shortly before the death of Anatoly Nikolaievich Demidov, 1st Prince of San Donato, for 1,600,000 francs (about £6,400). It was bought at the Demidov sale by Baron Anselm von Rothschild, and later inherited by his son Baron Ferdinand de Rothschild, who left it to the British Museum after his death in 1898 as part of the Waddesdon Bequest.

== Gallery ==
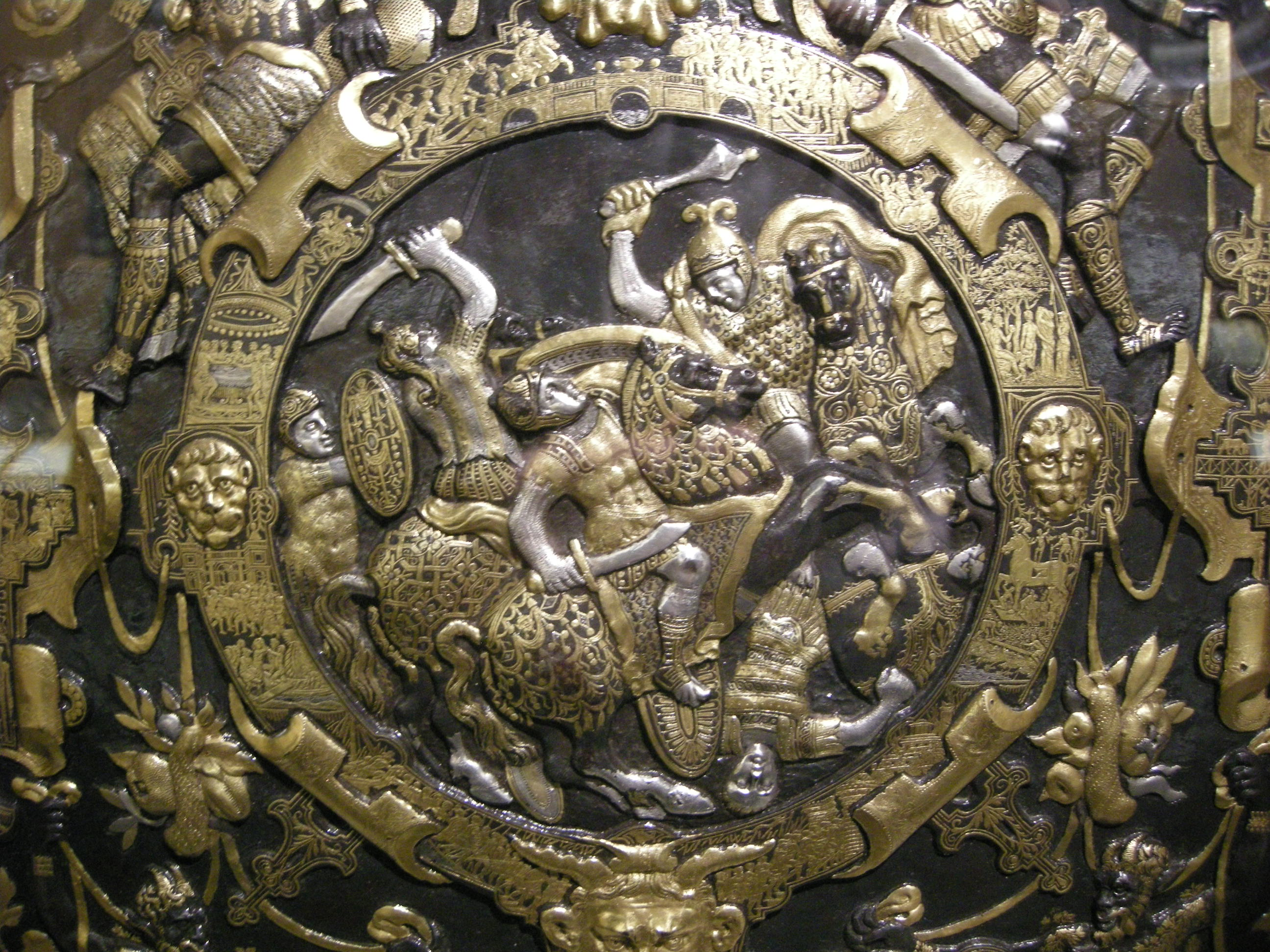
Central scene

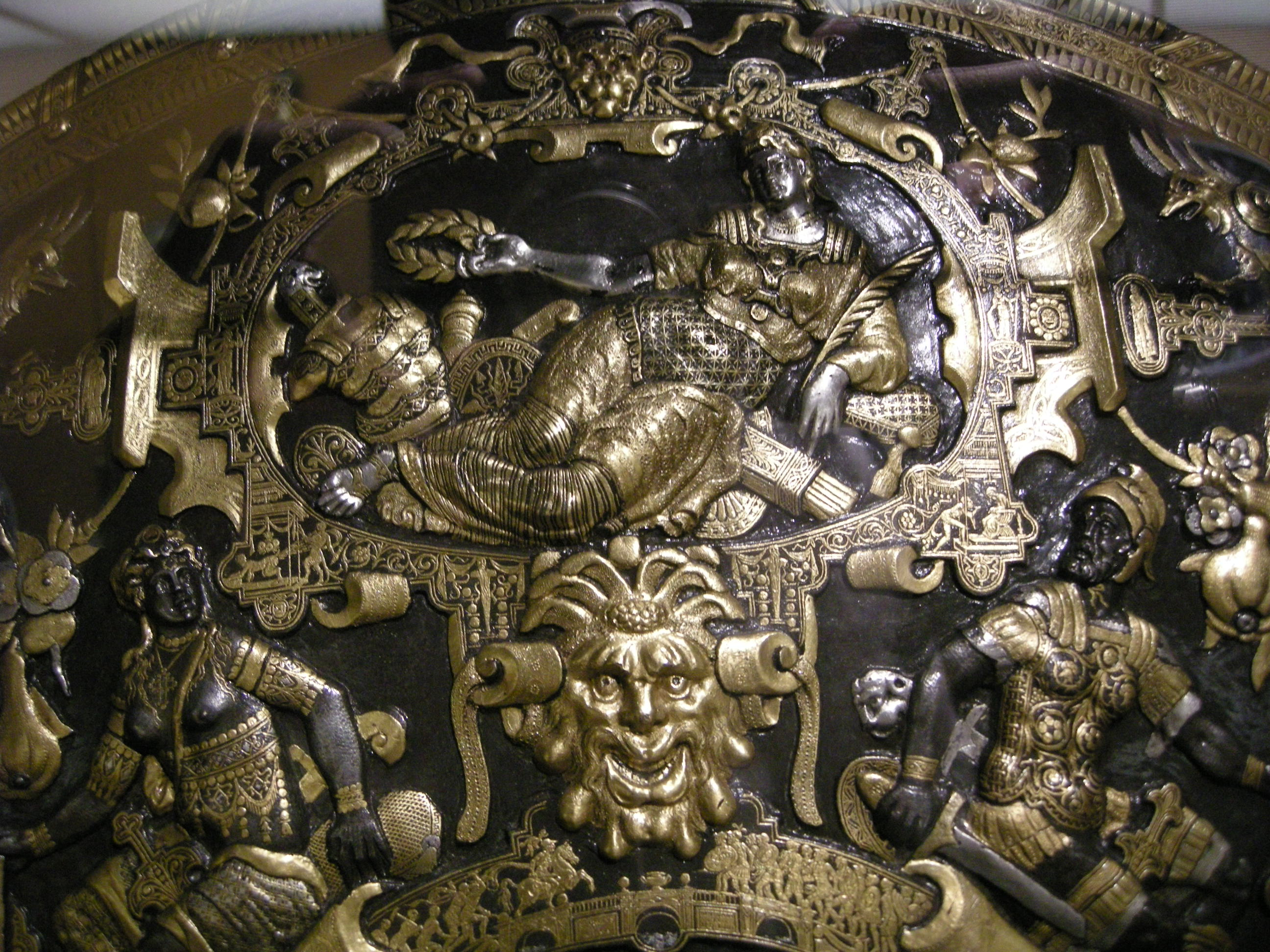
Victory (top cartouche)

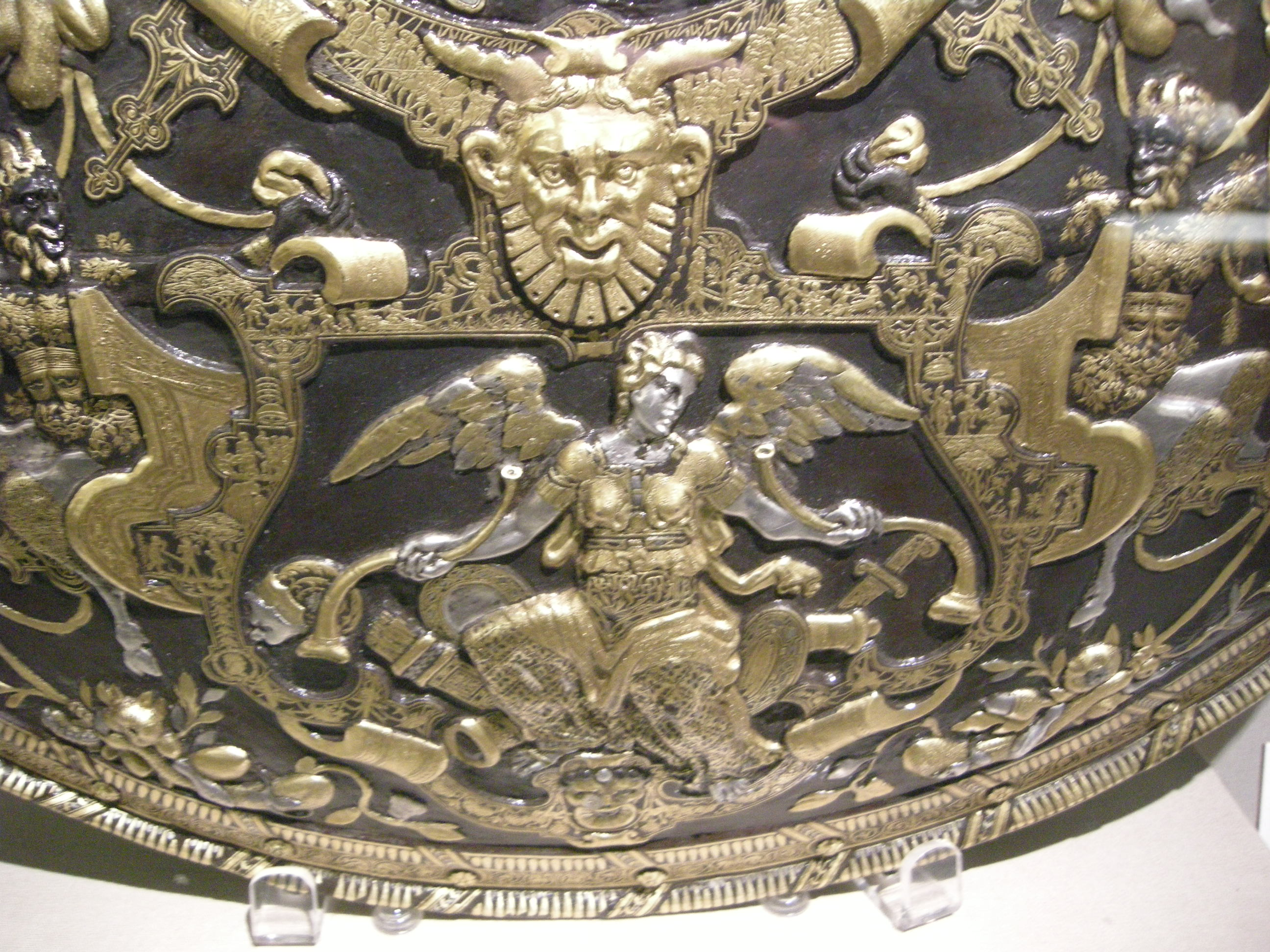
Fame (bottom cartouche)

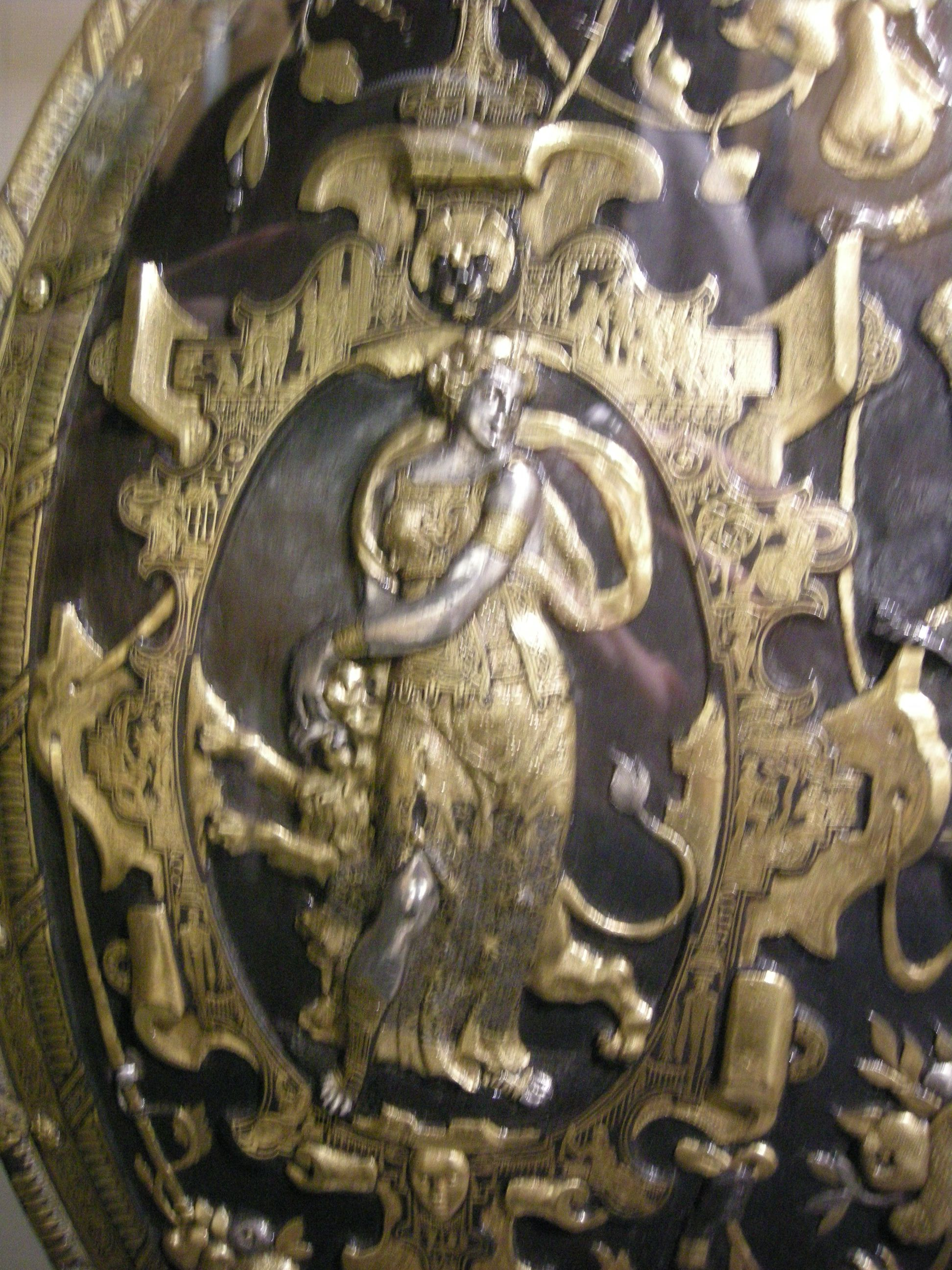
Fortitude (left cartouche)

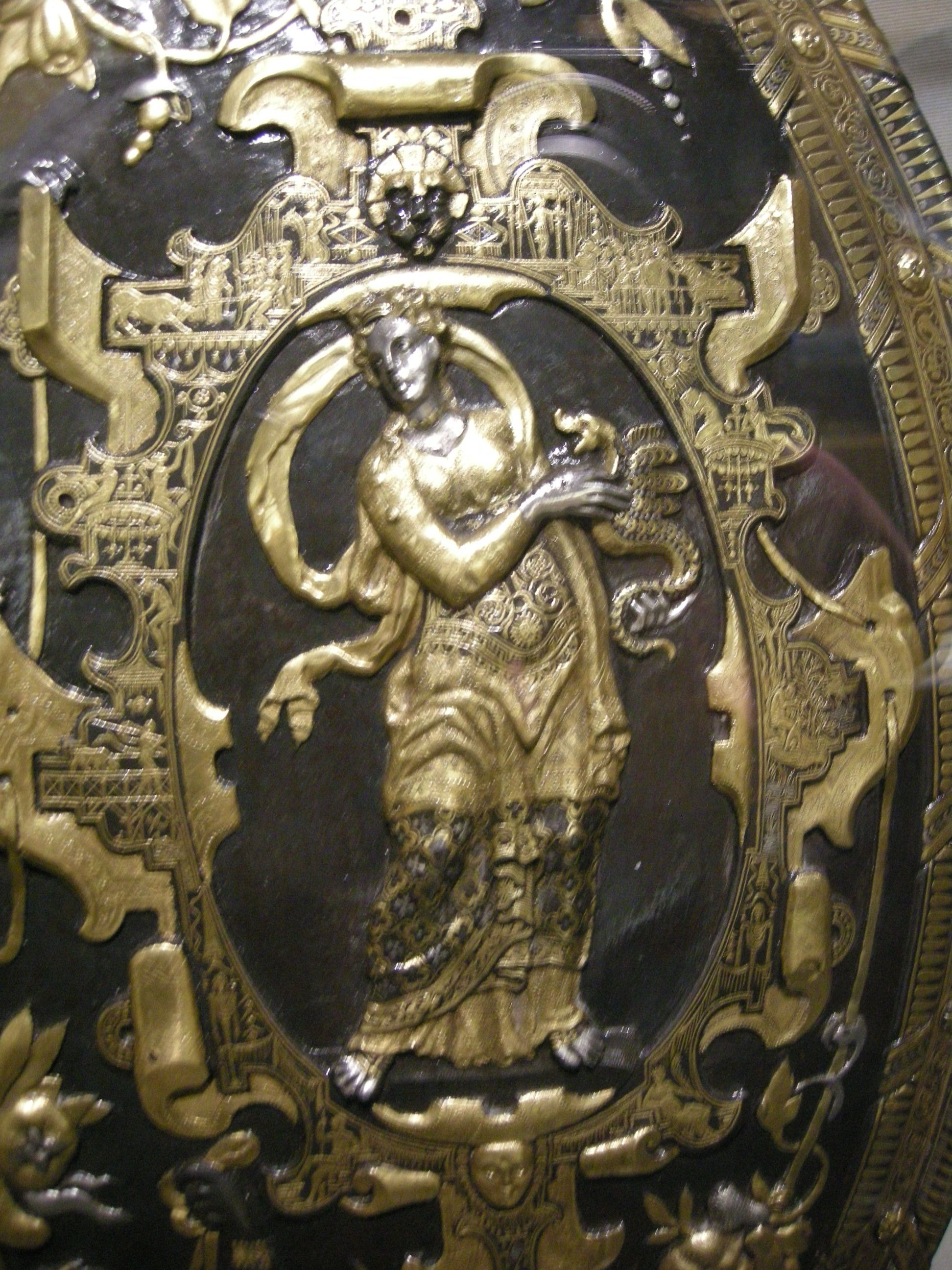
Prudence (right cartouche)

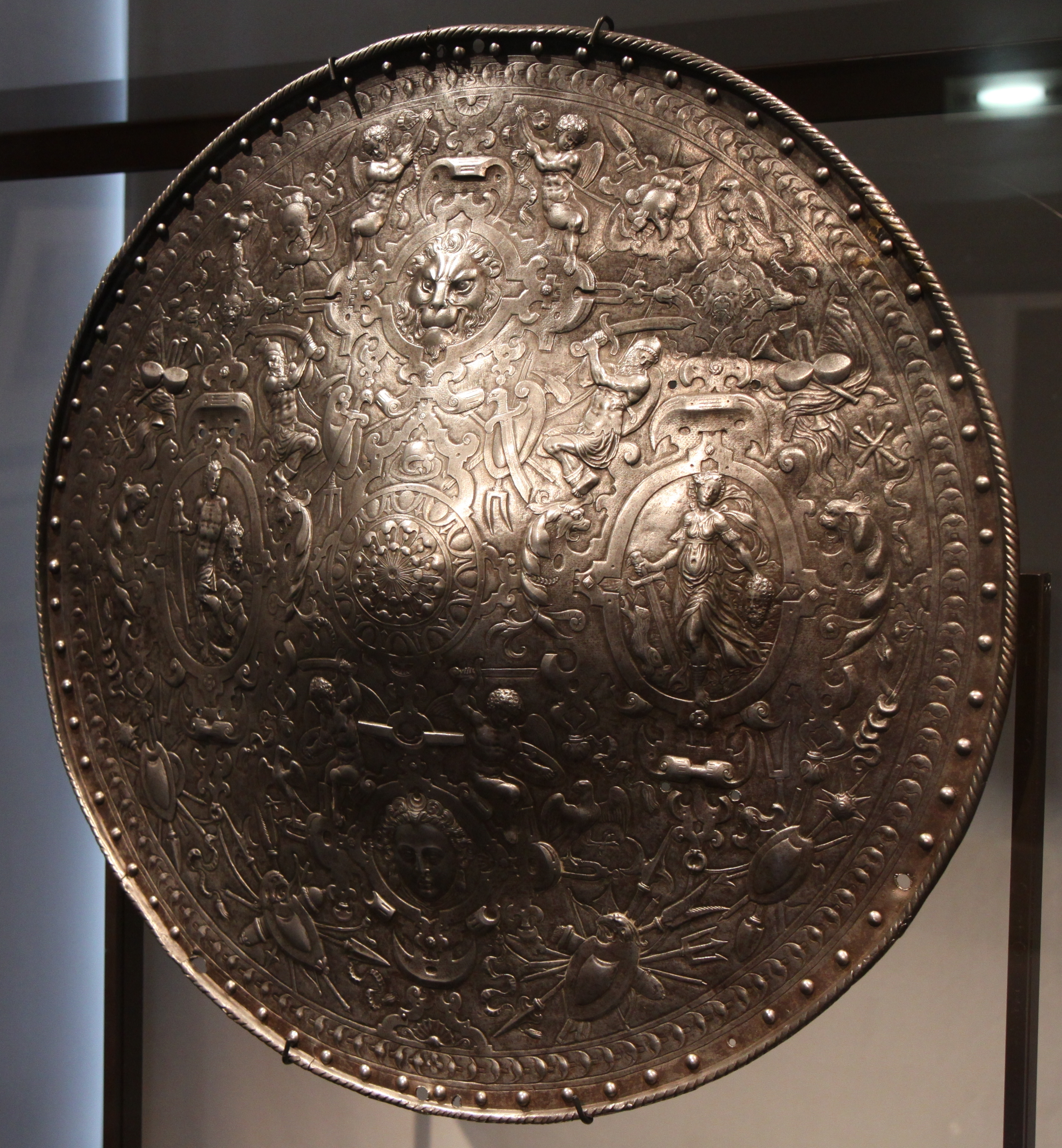
Contemporaneous Dutch rondache, c.1560s
