= Suzanne Boorsch =

American art historian (born 1937)

- Born: June 29, 1937 (age 89); United States
- Education: Smith College; New York University Institute of Fine Arts
- Occupations: Art historian Curator
- Employers: Metropolitan Museum of Art; Yale University Art Gallery
- Spouse: Allan Appel (m. 1978)
- Parent(s): Jean Boorsch; Louise Totten

Suzanne Boorsch (born June 29, 1937) is an American art historian, who specializes in Renaissance old master prints, as well as the art of Giorgio Ghisi, Andrea Mantegna, and Francesco Vanni. Boorsch is the Robert L. Solley Curator of Prints and Drawings at the Yale University Art Gallery.

== Career ==
Born to Jean Boorsch, Street Professor Emeritus of Romance Languages at Yale University, and Louise Totten, Boorsch received a Bachelor of Arts from Smith College in 1958. She then continued on to receive a Master of Arts in 1974 and a Master of Philosophy in 1977, both from New York University Institute of Fine Arts.

Boorsch began her career as Assistant Curator of Prints and Photographs at the Metropolitan Museum of Art. Boorsch then became the Robert L. Solley Curator of Prints and Drawings at the Yale University Art Gallery.

== Works ==
- The Engravings of Giorgio Ghisi, 1985, ISBN 978-0870993978
- Andrea Mantegna, 1992, ISBN 978-0900946400
- The French Renaissance in Prints, 1994, ISBN 978-0962816239
- Venetian Prints and Books in the Age of Tiepolo, 1997, ISBN 978-0870998249
- Master Drawings from the Yale University Art Gallery, 2006, ISBN 978-0300114331
- Francesco Vanni, Art in Late Renaissance Siena, 2013, ISBN 978-0-300-13548-0
