= Diana Scultori =

Italian sculptor (1547–1612)

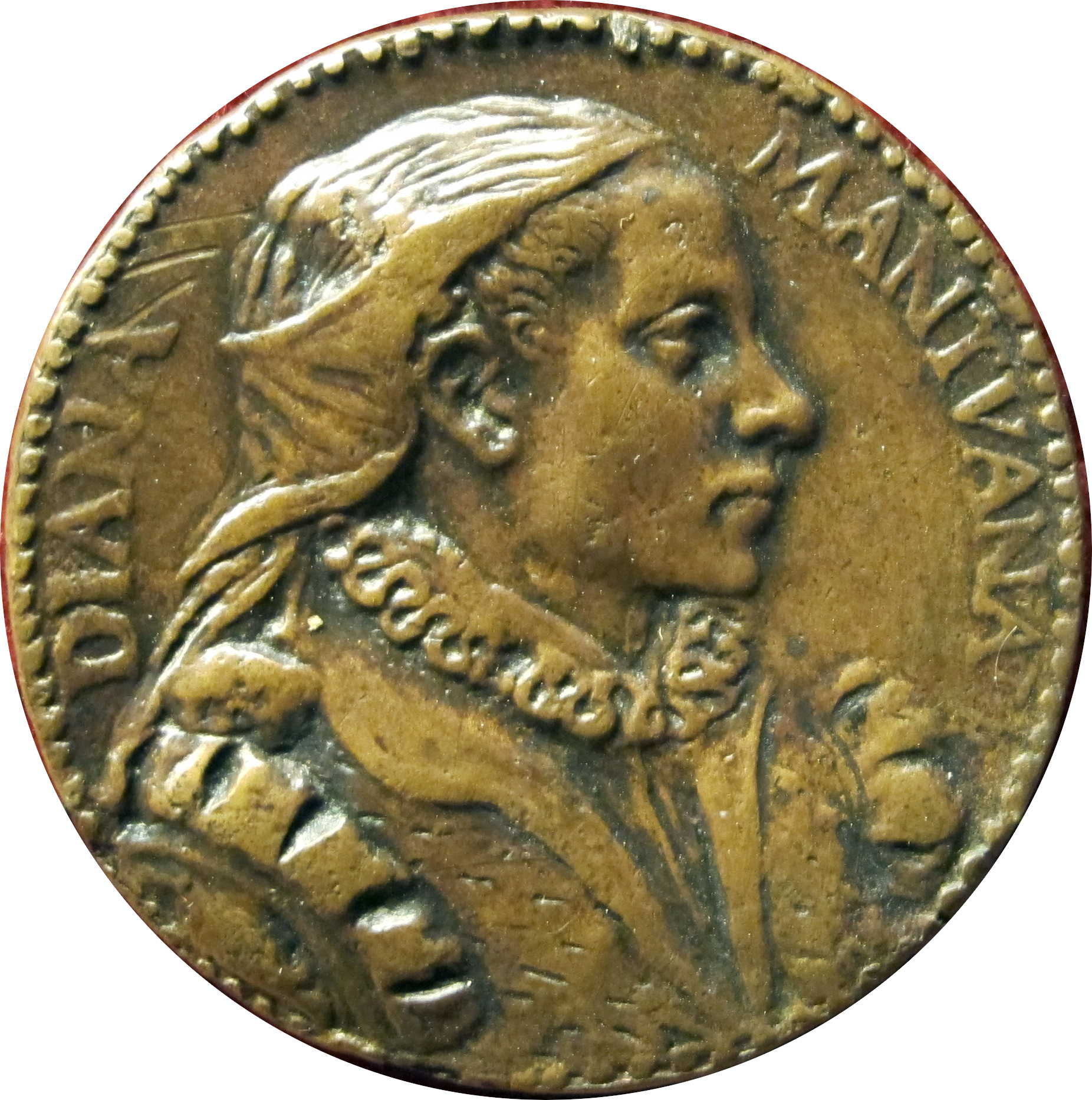
- Born: 1547; Mantua
- Died: 5 April 1612 (aged 64–65); Rome

Diana Scultori (also known as Diana Mantuana and Diana Ghisi; 1547 – 5 April 1612) was an Italian engraver from Mantua, Italy. She is one of the earliest known women printmakers, making mostly reproductive engravings of well-known paintings or drawings, especially those of Raphael and Giulio Romano, or ancient Roman sculptures.

She was one of four children of the sculptor and engraver Giovanni Battista Scultori and the sister of the artist Adamo Scultori, who was many years older. Both of them are often called "Ghisi" from the family's close association with Giorgio Ghisi, a more significant artist, and a misreading of a remark by Vasari. Diana learned the art of engraving from her father, and probably her brother. She was mentioned in the second edition of Giorgio Vasari’s Lives of the Artists (1568).

In 1565, she met her first husband, the architect Francesco da Volterra (Capriani). The pair moved to Rome by 1575. Once in Rome, Diana used her knowledge of business within the art world to advance her husband's career. On 5 June 1575, she received a Papal Privilege to make and market her own work. She used the importance of signature and dedication to her advantage. Three years later (1578) she gave birth to her son Giovanni Battista Capriani. Both Diana symbolically and Francesco actively became members of the Archconfraternity of the Cord of Saint Joseph during their artistic careers. The last known print by Diana dates 1588. After the death of her husband, she remarried another architect, Giulio Pelosi. She died in 1612.

== Early life ==
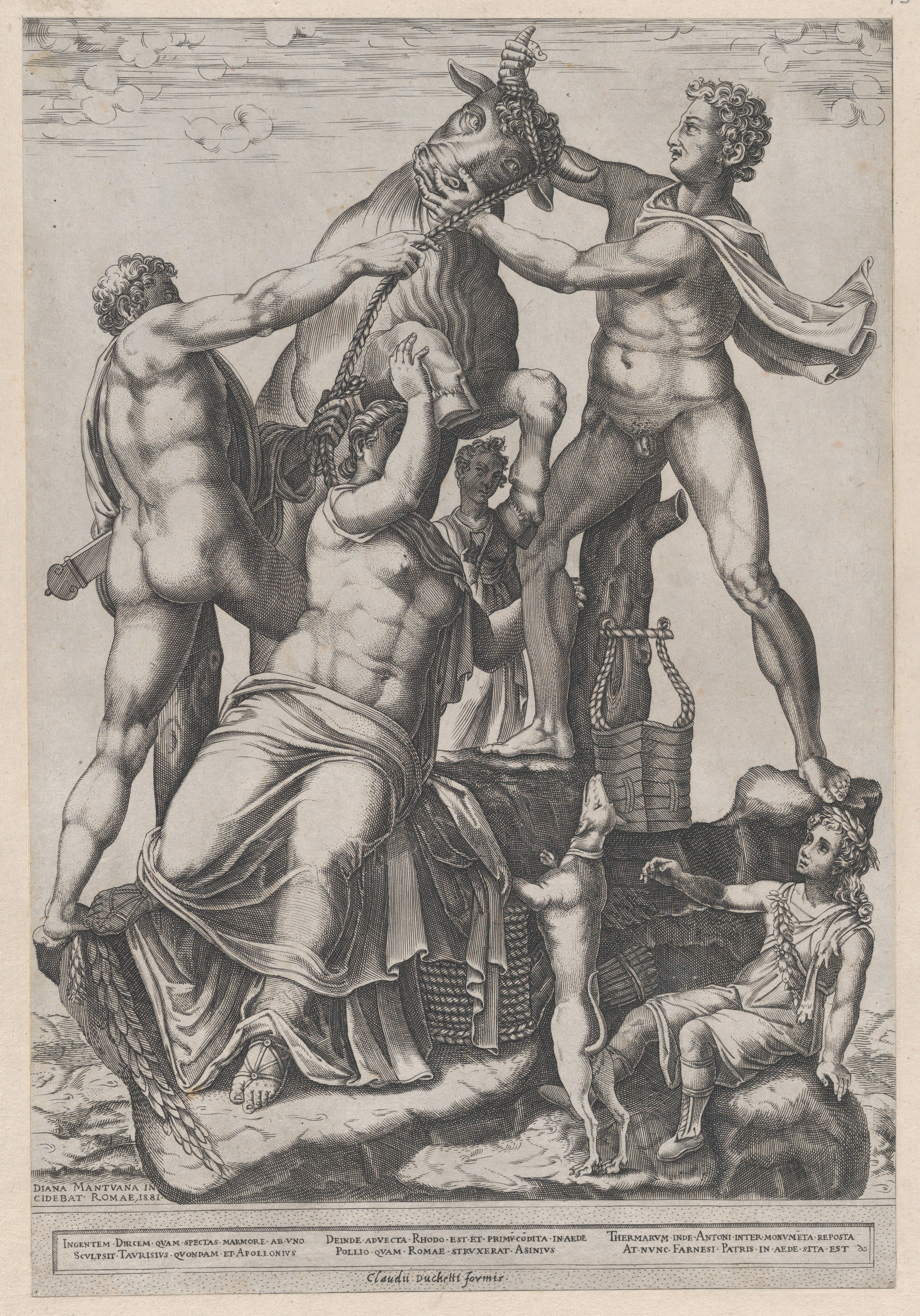
Engraving of Amphion and Zethus Tying Dirce to a Wild Bull -The Farnese Bull, a famous Roman sculpture recently excavated.

The cultural changes associated with the Italian Renaissance were providing women greater opportunities to study art, and it became possible for female artists to gain international reputations. The work of Diana Scultori, born in 1547, is a reflection of this changing climate. One of three daughters of the Scultori family, as a woman she was unable to have a formal apprenticeship, but her father taught her his trade. Despite her lack of education in drawing specifically, she was able to use drawings from other artists to learn how to produce engravings.

It was not unusual for the daughters of artisans to be trained in the family craft, but it was considered uncommon for a daughter to be trained in engraving and to make it a career as she did. She received her first public recognition as an engraver in Giorgio Vasari’s second edition of Vites (1568).

After her marriage in 1575 to the aspiring architect Francesco da Volterra, the couple moved to Rome. Here, the focus of her work was reinterpreting works by artists linked to her husband and the papal workshops. Most prints were made to promote and support his career as an architect. She was well known for being concerned with maintaining a good reputation. She was regarded as a keen business woman, and one of the few women artists whom Vasari mentioned in the 1568 edition of his Lives, noting that she "engraves so well that it is a thing to marvel at; and I who saw her, a very gentle and gracious girl, and her works, which are most beautiful, was struck with amazement." She worked within the restrictions encountered by artists of her time, female or otherwise. She used other artists' work as a foundation for her prints, but most of the drawings for her engravings came from either her husband, a family member, including her father, or an artist contemporary with whom she and her husband were acquainted.

== Career ==
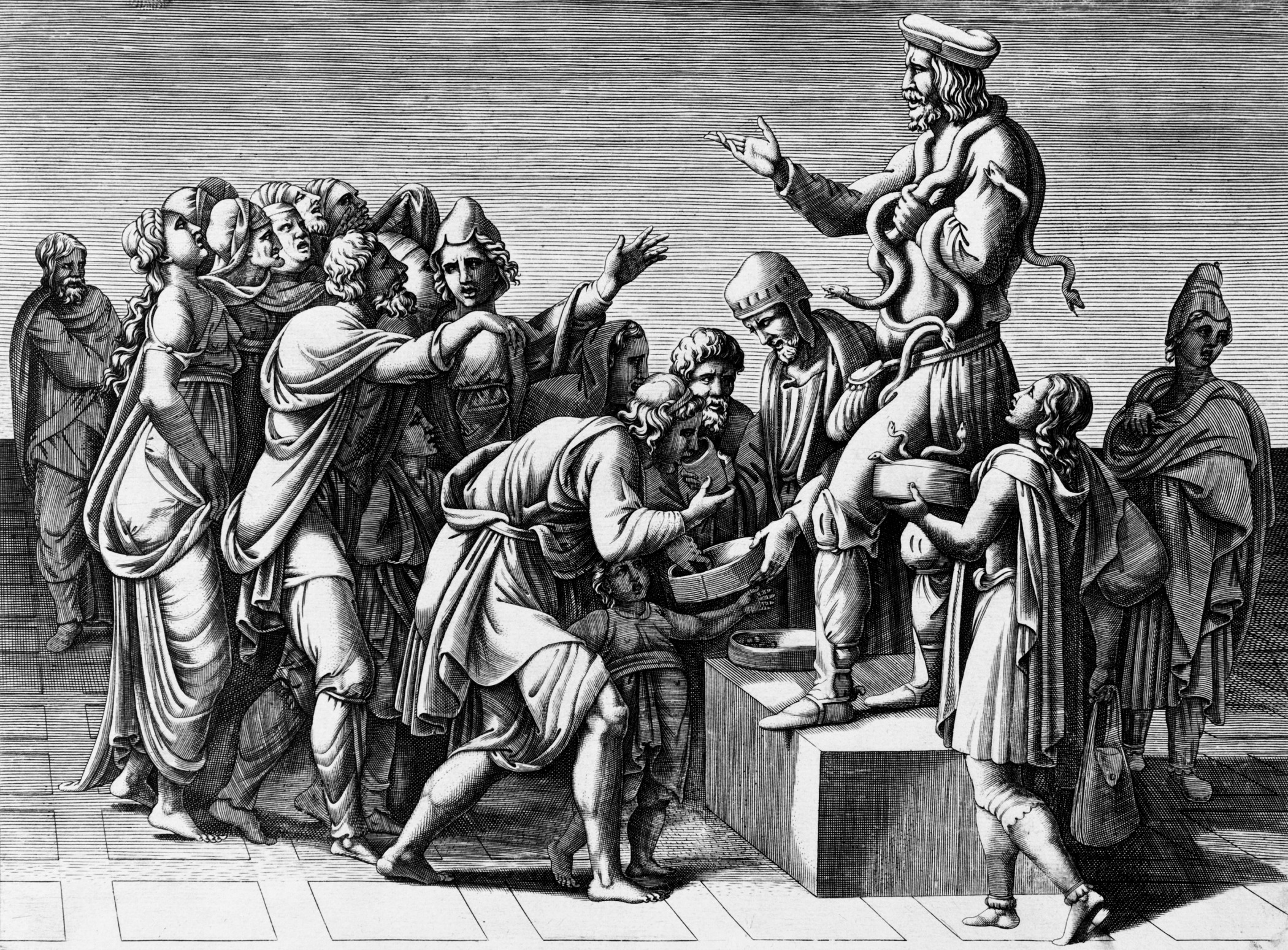
The Snakeholder, after Giulio Romano

On 5 June 1575, the year of her first dated print, Scultori received the Papal Privilege to make and market her own work. Applying for a papal privilege was a fairly unusual practice before the papacy of Gregory XIII, especially for women, and it allowed her to establish a name for her household. Resembling a book-printing privilege, it is about 300 words in length and names Diana as "wife of Franciscus Cipriani the architect, who is staying in this our alma Urbe ..." and indicates that she learned her art from her father. The privilege suggests that Diana applied for it because she was reluctant to print her engravings without a license and it was to protect her engravings from being copied and then sold "by others of either sex, but most especially book dealers, sculptors, engravers and printers". The privilege rendered any unlicensed publisher or vendor of her engravings liable to a heavy fine of approximately 500 ducati. Of this, one third would have gone to the Pope in office, one third to Diana, and the final third to the judge who issued the decision, naturally encouraging a judgment in favor of the artist. In addition to such a fine, immediate excommunication from the Catholic Church would be incurred.

Her astuteness as a businesswoman can be seen not only in her successful application for a papal privilege, but also in her prints that promoted her husband's architectural work. Between 1576 and 1580, she made four prints featuring column capital volutes and other architectural details, including “bead and reel” and “egg and dart” moldings. Unlike many of her other prints, these prints do not appear to have been intended for a general audience, but instead for someone with advanced knowledge of ancient architectural details. One relatively lengthy inscription on the earliest dated of these four prints further supports this interpretation: "This volute and old composite capital order of a numidian stone column, from St Peter in Vaticano for the Baptistry of Saint Peter was recorded by Francesco da Volterra in order to be useful to these artists for study. Diana Mantuana, his wife, engraved it. 1576." During her career she was made an Honorary Citizen of Volterra, Italy in 1566, and was given a symbolic membership to the Confraternity of San Giuseppe in Cagli, Italy in 1570. To celebrate the husband-and-wife artists admitted to the Congregazione dei Virtuosi del Pantheon, a pair of medallions were created. The inscription on the obverse side of the medal, where she is shown with a matronly veil, simply says “Diana of Mantua.” The absence of her father's or husband's name was unusual for the time.

== Prominent works ==
Christ and the Woman Taken in Adultery is the third engraving undertaken by Diana Scultori after Giulio Romano. It is a copy after one of the tapestries Raphael and his workshop designed for the Sistine Chapel. Depicted is a scene taken from the Book of John. A woman, perhaps Mary Magdalene, is accused of adultery and taken to Jesus for punishment. Jesus refuses to sentence her to be stoned, but instead offers any person without sin to cast the first stone. The figures of Christ and the young woman are depicted framed by the twisting Solomonic columns in the portico of a round temple. The architectural space recalls the ancient columns of Saint Peter's in Rome. A shrewd businesswoman, Diana was careful to maintain beneficial patronage in Mantua after leaving for Rome. Scultori dedicated the engraving to Eleonora of Austria, wife of Duke William I, and duchess of Mantua. In a letter to Eleonora, Diana says: "To her Serene Highness Lady Eleonora of Austria, Duchess of Mantua/ Diana Manuan/ I feel myself so tied to the memory of Your Ladyship’s most fortunate dominion, under which I possess, that to satisfy in par the gratitude in my soul I have been so bold as to bring this work of mine to light under her great name, in order that, returning to where it had its beginning, it serves her prince again, as a token of my service to Your Highness and your most serene house. From Rome, September 1, 1575."

The Gonzaga family was one of the private parties who bought a set of tapestries woven from the same drawings as the papal originals. They are easily recognized as the Mantuan palace's decoration. The Gonzaga version of the tapestry is a visual reference to the heritage of Raphael and the connection to Vatican taste and wealth. The engraving also makes a statement of Scultori's double allegiances to Mantua and to Rome.

Christ Making Peter Head of the Church is another print Scultori may have copied from Raphael's sketches. However, it is most likely the image was from the tapestry copies that the Gonzaga family commissioned from the same workshop where the original Sistine Chapel tapestries were woven. This work depicts the moment when Christ appoints Peter as head of the church in the Gospel of Matthew, which was a popular subject for the time. The original set of these tapestries was commissioned by Pope Leo X for the Sistine Chapel. The engraving was created in Mantua, but later taken to Rome where it was published and printed in various editions.

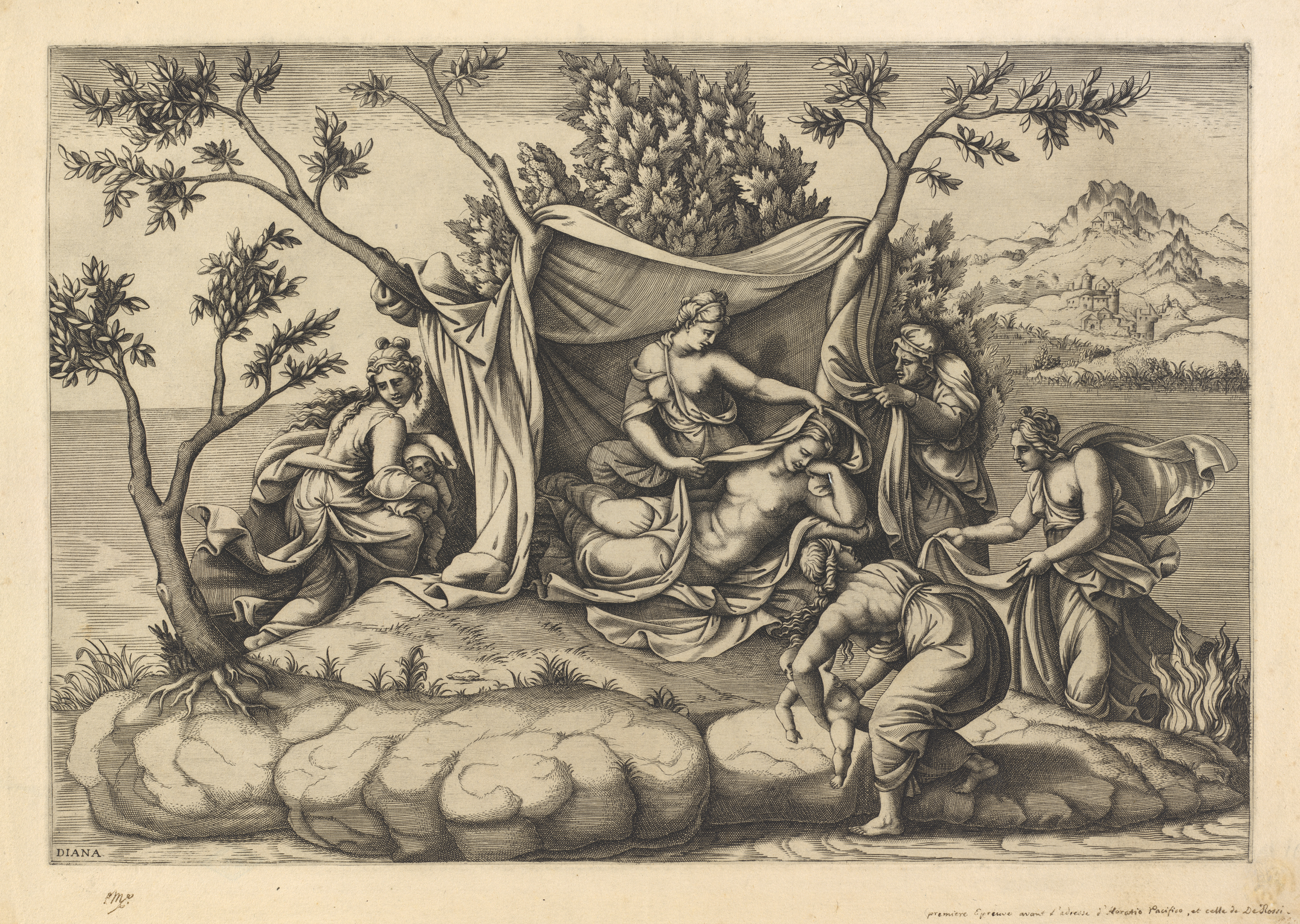
Latona Giving Birth to Apollo and Diana on the Island of Delos, after Giulio Romano

Latona Giving Birth to Apollo and Diana on the Island of Delos was produced during her early career in Mantua. It depicts Latona, the lover of Jupiter and protector of the nymphs, after giving birth to twins Apollo and Diana. To escape from the jealousy of Juno, Latona sought refuge on the island of Delos. The episode follows the myth in Ovid's Metamorphosis which became a popular source of inspiration for artists during the 16th century. The scene was taken from a preparatory drawing by Giulio Romano for his painting of the same subject.

=== Signature ===
Her father was an engraver for the Mantuan court of the Gonzaga family. Diana changed her name on her prints to be better associated with the court. Many variations of her signature, inscriptions and dedications convey her awareness as an artist and an entrepreneur. She is the first woman who signed her full name on a print, but she signed various signatures at different points in her lifetime. It is not recorded in any of her works that she went by, or signed the name, Scultori. She most often signed her work “Diana Mantuana” or “Diana Mantovana” to reference the city in which she was born. This signature also served to reference Mantuan nobility and the engraving tradition of Mantua which would mean more to influential people in Rome than the surname with which she was born. While she changed her signature over the years, she never signed with the name "Diana Scultori" on any of her prints or documents.

== Later life ==
Her last dated print, from 1588, was The Entombment after Paris Nogari. After Francesco da Volterra’s death, she married Giulio Pelosi, another architect, in 1596, who was 20 years her junior. It is unlikely that she made additional prints following 1588, but her reason for stopping is still unknown. She died 24 years later in Rome on 5 April 1612, aged 64 or 65. Several of her engravings continued to be printed after her death.

== Exhibitions ==
From 26 January – 29 July 2024, Scultori was the subject of Diana Scultori: An Engraver in Renaissance Rome, Philadelphia Museum of Art.

From 11 October 2025 – 11 January 2026, the Appartamento della Rustica of the Palazzo Ducale in Mantua exhibited Diana Scultori, rare carver: An artist between Mantua and Rome in the sixteenth century. The exhibition features 40 works, including drawings, medals, and engravings on copper and paper.

== Sources ==
- The Engravings of Giorgio Ghisi. New York: Metropolitan Museum of Art.
- Nicholson, Elizabeth S. G. "Diana Scultori." Italian Women Artists from Renaissance to Baroque: National Museum of Women in the Arts. Milano: Skira, 2007. 126–34. Print.
