= Rondache =

Medieval shield

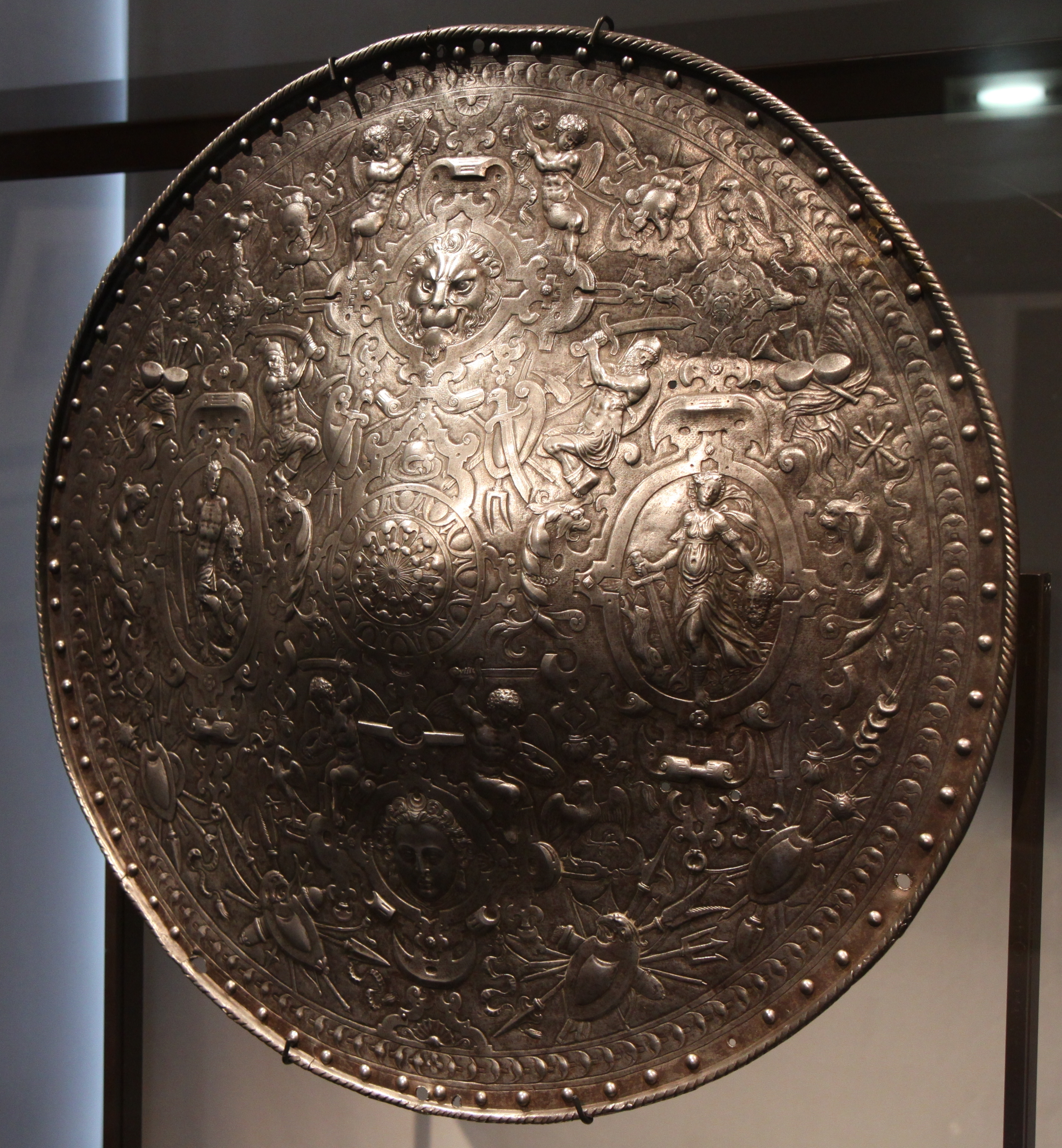
A parade rondache in metal from the 16th century

The rondache or roundel was a shield carried by late Medieval and Renaissance foot soldiers (swordsman). It was made of boards of light wood, sinews or ropes, covered with leather, plates of metal, or stuck full of nails in concentric circles or other figures. Widespread among the infantrymen of northern Italy in the 15th century.

== See also ==
- Ghisi Shield, another elaborate parade shield.
- Rodeleros
