= Francesco da Volterra =

Italian painter

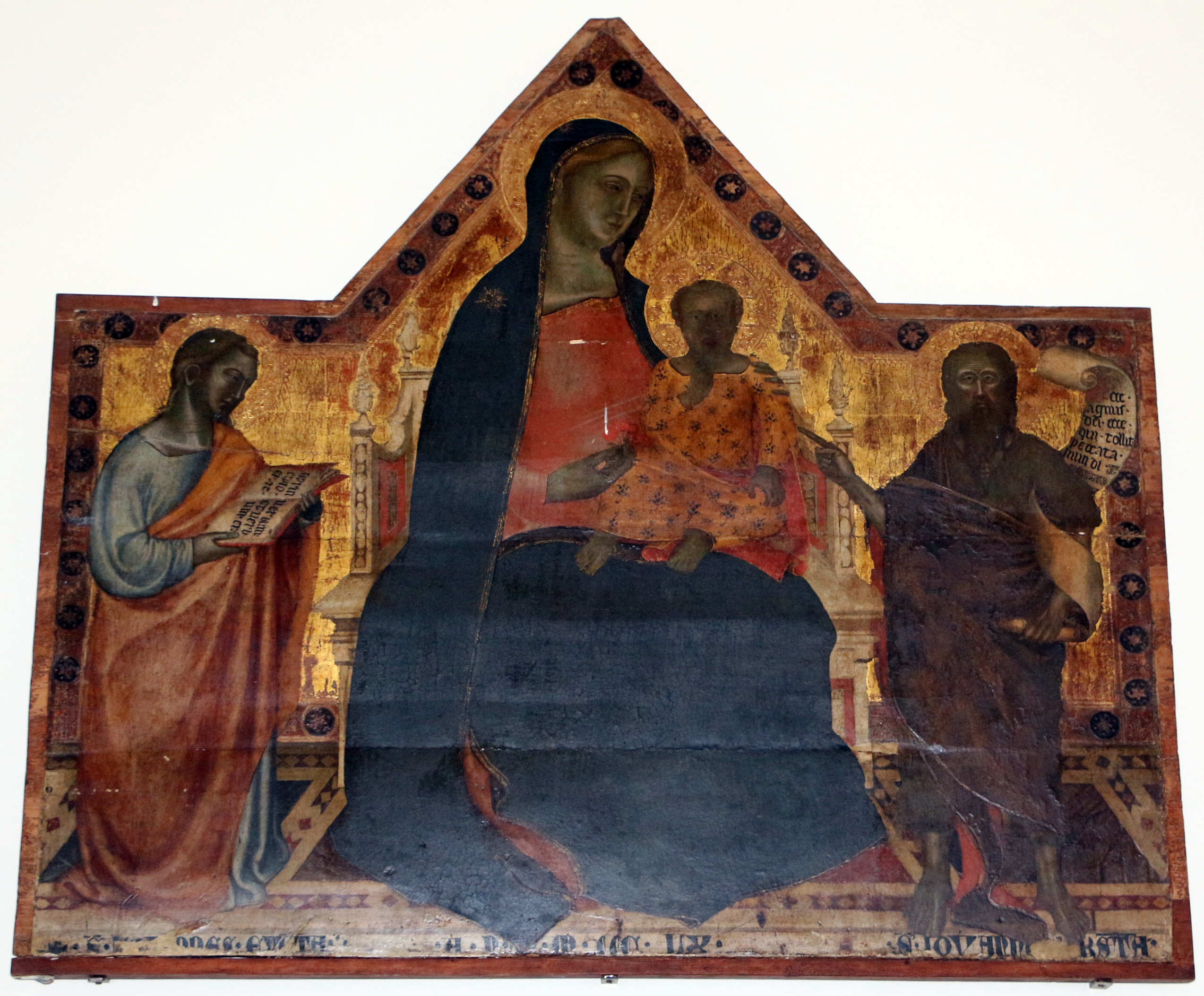
Madonna and saints, Pietrasanta

Francesco da Volterra (/voʊlˈtɛrə/, Italian: [franˈtʃesko da (v)volˈtɛrra]) was an Italian painter and architect. He resided in Pisa from 1370 to 1372, where, from the records of the Campo Santo, he painted the History of Job on the south wall. Like the rest of the earlier pictures in the Campo Santo, it is now almost obliterated, but some idea of its weird realism may still be formed from Lasinio's Pitture del Campo Santo and other reproductions in Italian books on art. Francesco da Volterra is supposed to have been identical with Francesco di Maestro Giotto, a painter of Florence, whose name occurs in the records of the city Guild for 1341.

He is not to be confused with the 16th-century architect Francesco Capriani da Volterra, student of Vignola and husband of the engraver Diana Scultori or Mantuana.

== Sources ==
- Bryan, Michael (1889). Walter Armstrong; Robert Edmund Graves (eds.). Dictionary of Painters and Engravers, Biographical and Critical. Vol. II L-Z. London: George Bell and Sons. p. 682.
