= Adamo Scultori =

Italian engraver, sculptor and artist

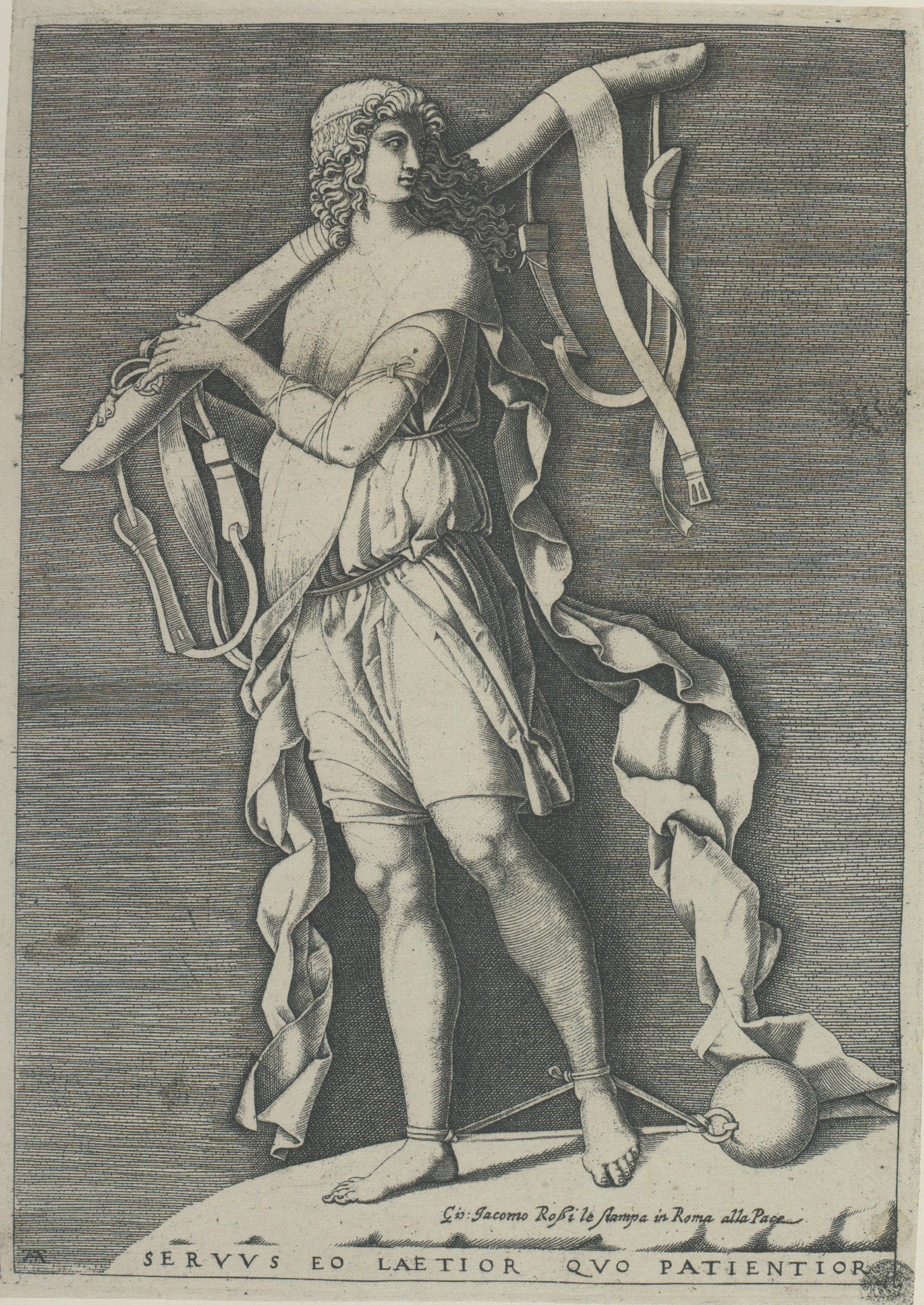
Adamo Scultori: Allegory of Slavery, etching, 1573, Croatian Academy of Sciences and Arts - Department of Prints and Drawings

Adamo Scultori (c.1530 – 1585), also referred to as Adamo Ghisi, was an Italian engraver, sculptor and artist.

Scultori was born in Mantua. He came from an artistic family: his father Giovanni Battista Scultori and sister Diana Scultori were both artists. Because of his family's close association with the artist Giorgio Ghisi, his sister and he were sometimes referred to by the Ghisi surname. He died in 1585. Some of his works can be seen at the Cleveland Museum of Art. and the Slovak National Gallery.
