= Giovanni Battista Scultori =

Italian painter and printmaker

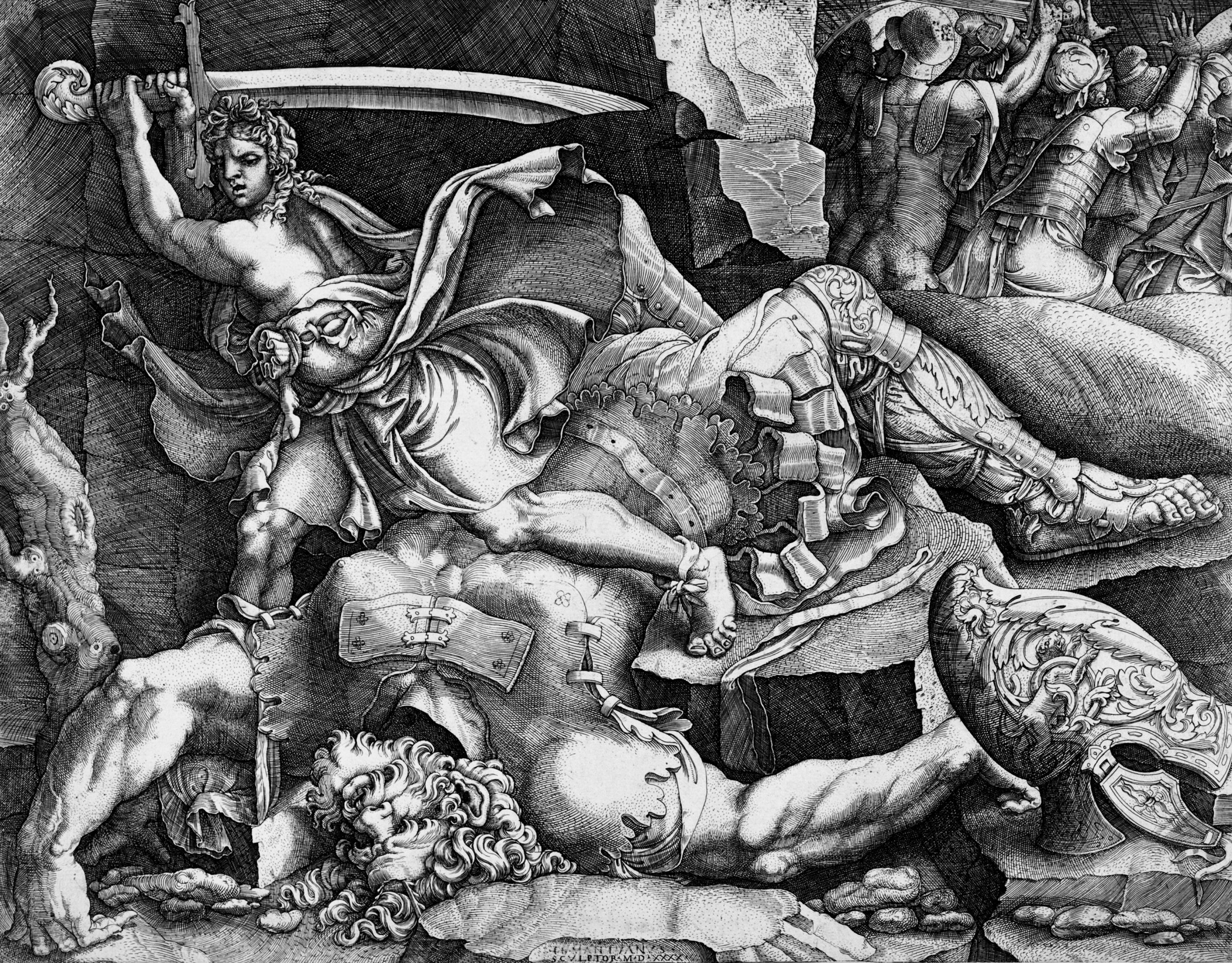
David and Goliath, engraving, 1540

Giovanni Battista Scultori (1503 – 29 December 1575), also Giovanni Battista Mantovano or Mantuana, was an Italian Mannerist painter, sculptor and engraver.

Scultori was born in Mantua. He was a pupil of Giulio Romano, and supported himself through work in the Palazzo del Te. Most of what is known about him is through the 20 or so engravings of his that have survived. His son Adamo Scultori and daughter Diana Scultori also became engravers. Scultori died in Mantua in 1575.
