= Musée Rolin =

Museum in Autun, Burgundy, France

Coordinates: 46°56′45″N 4°17′57″E

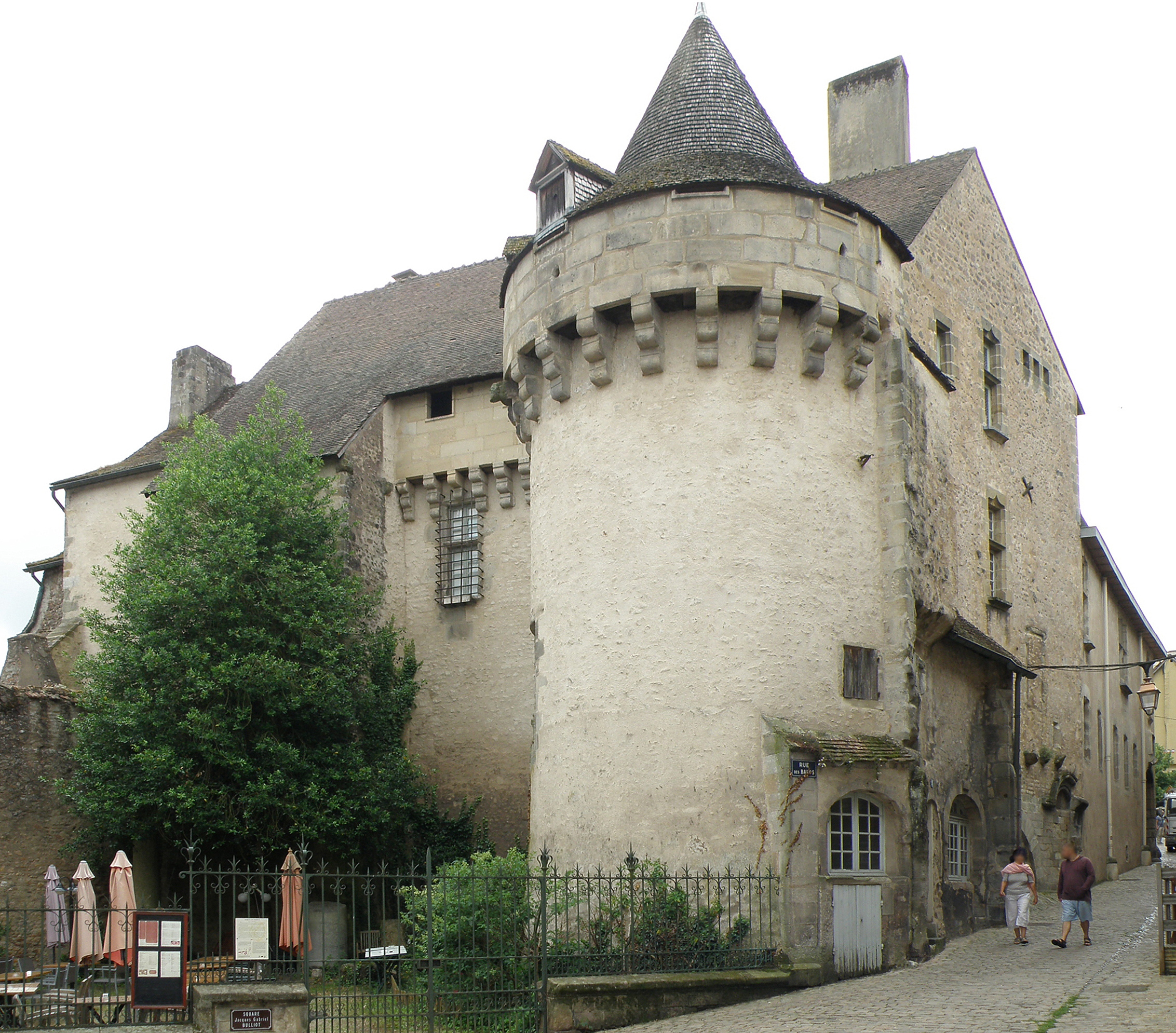
The Hôtel du Chancelier Rolin, which houses the museum

The Musée Rolin is an art museum in Autun, Burgundy, France.

Created in 1878 on the initiative of the Société éduenne, it is located on the site of the former home of Chancellor Nicolas Rolin. Its collections range from Gallo-Roman archaeology to 20th century painting, and are spread over more than twenty rooms. The museum's collections are divided into four departments: archaeology, medieval art, regional history and fine arts (17th to 20th century). It is classified as a "Museum of France", and remains the headquarters of the Société éduenne.

== Collection ==
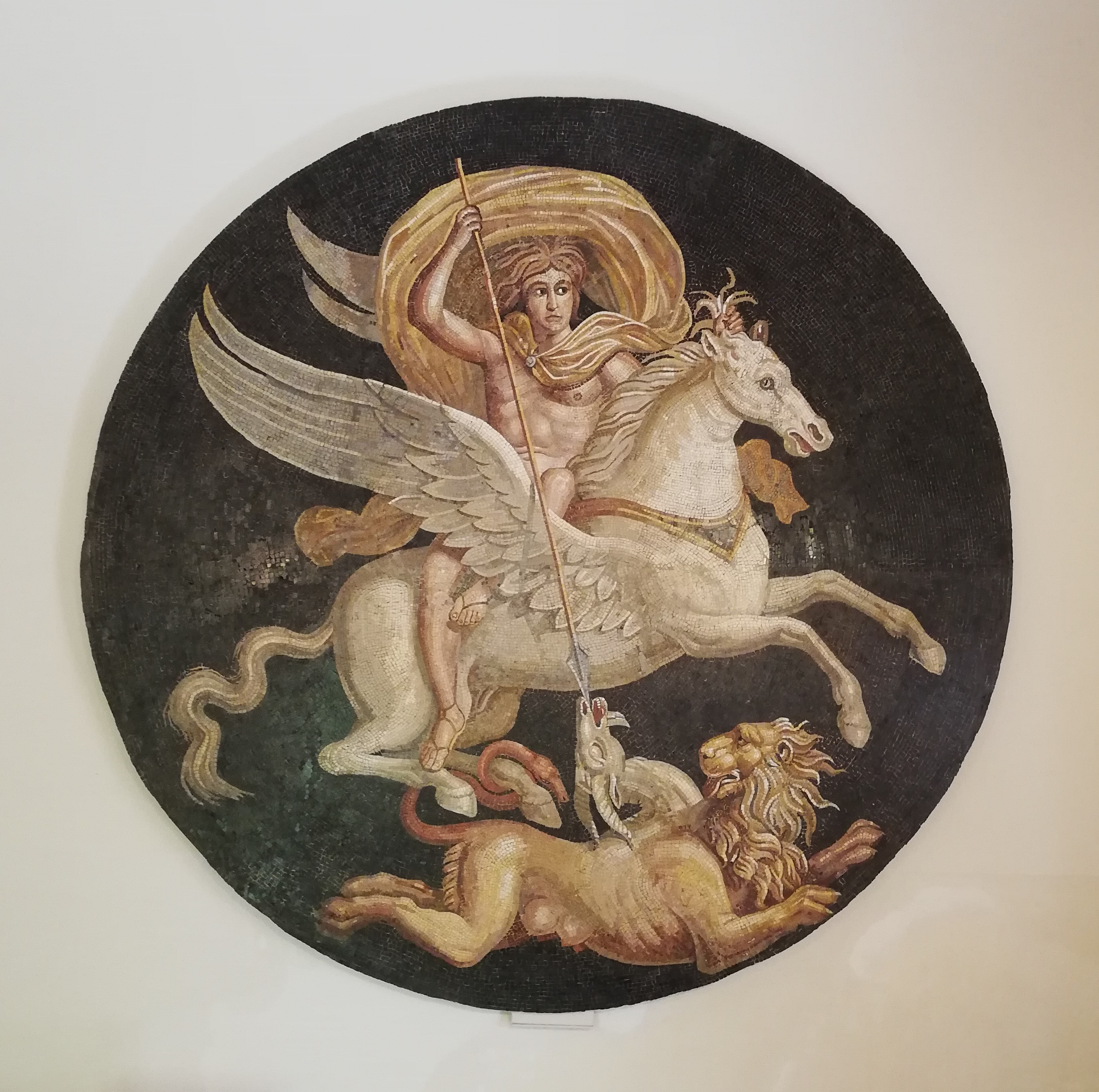
Mosaic of Bellerophon, 2nd century

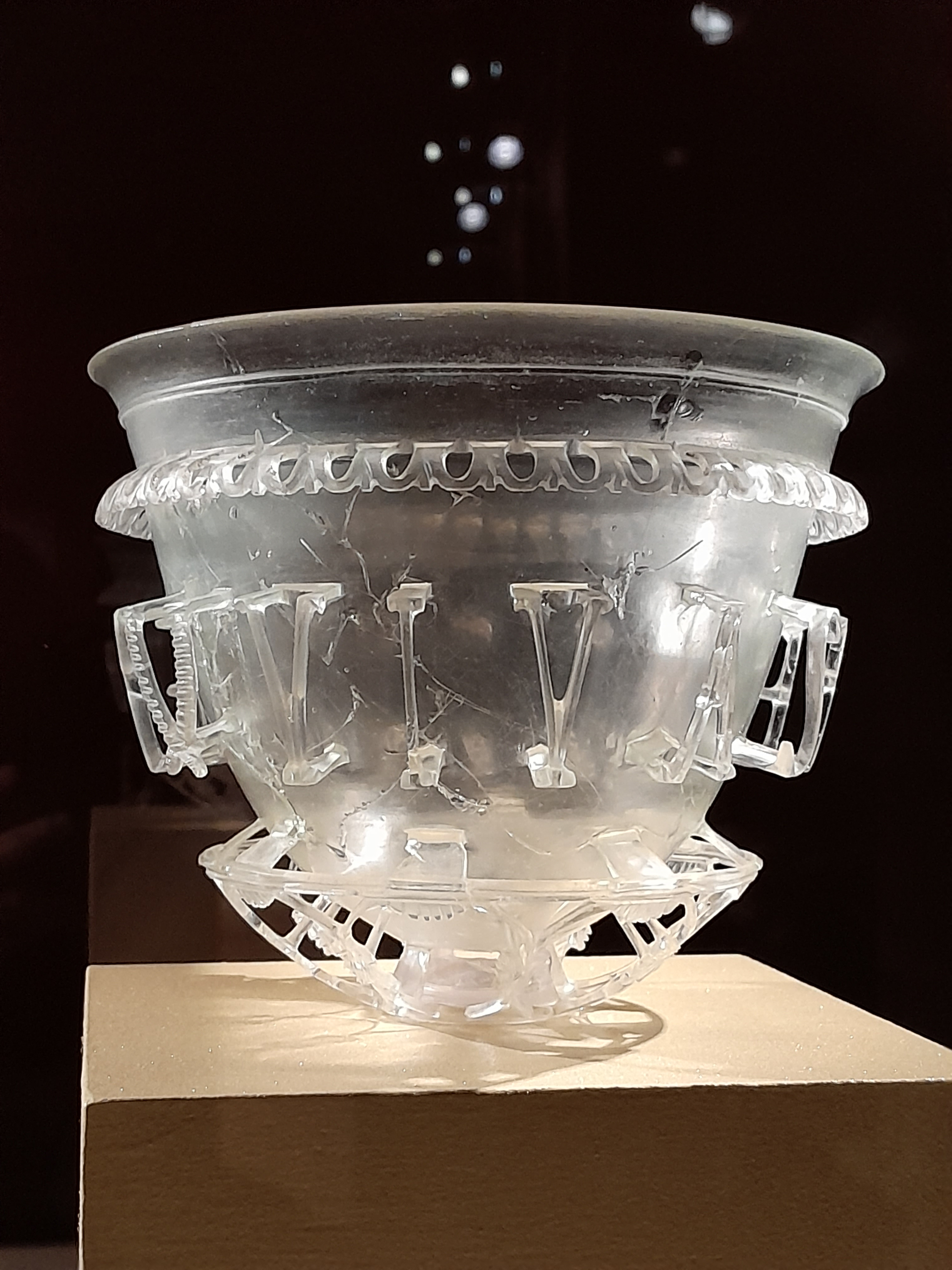
Autun cup, Roman cage cup, 4th century

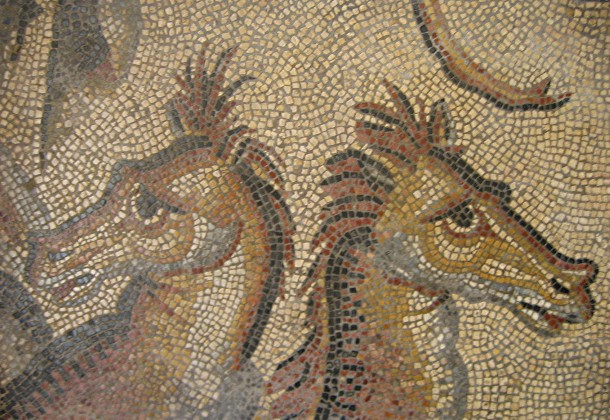
Detail of a fragment of the Mosaic of the triumph of Neptune, Gallo-Roman period

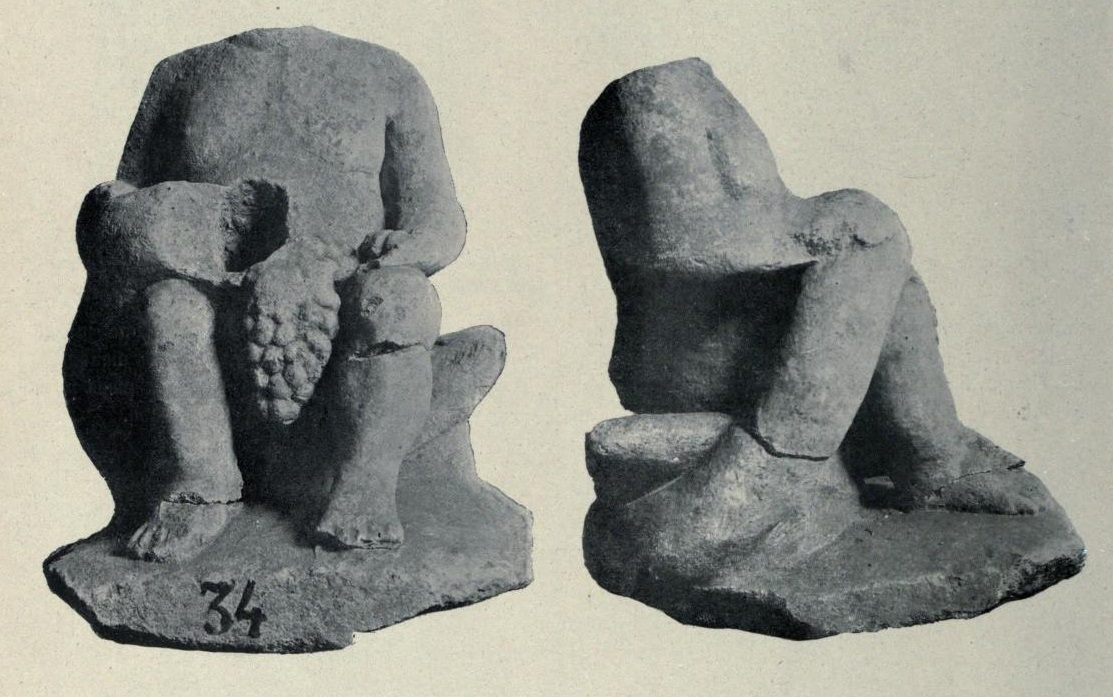
The God of Lantilly, Gallo-Roman period.

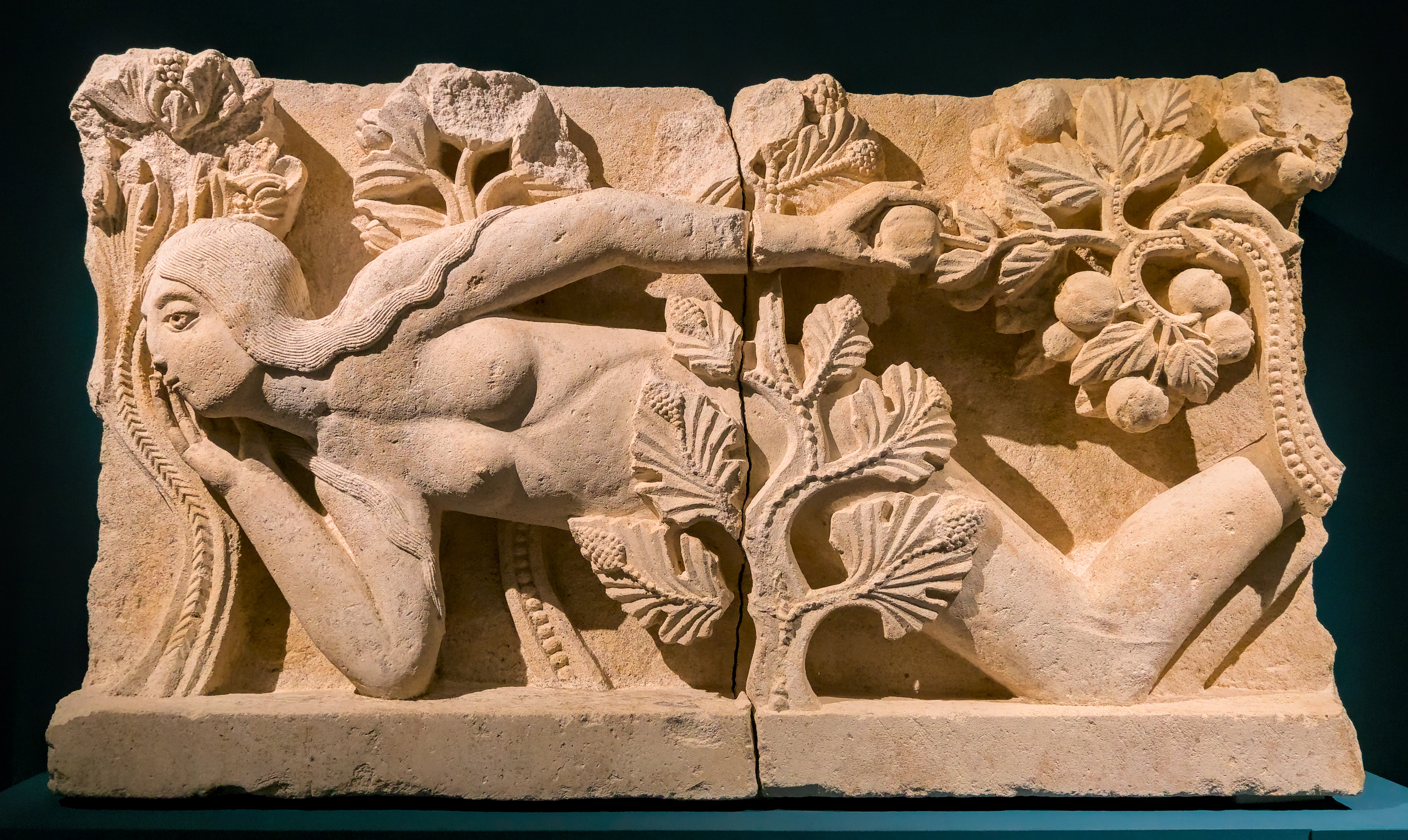
The Temptation of Eve (circa 1130) by Gislebertus

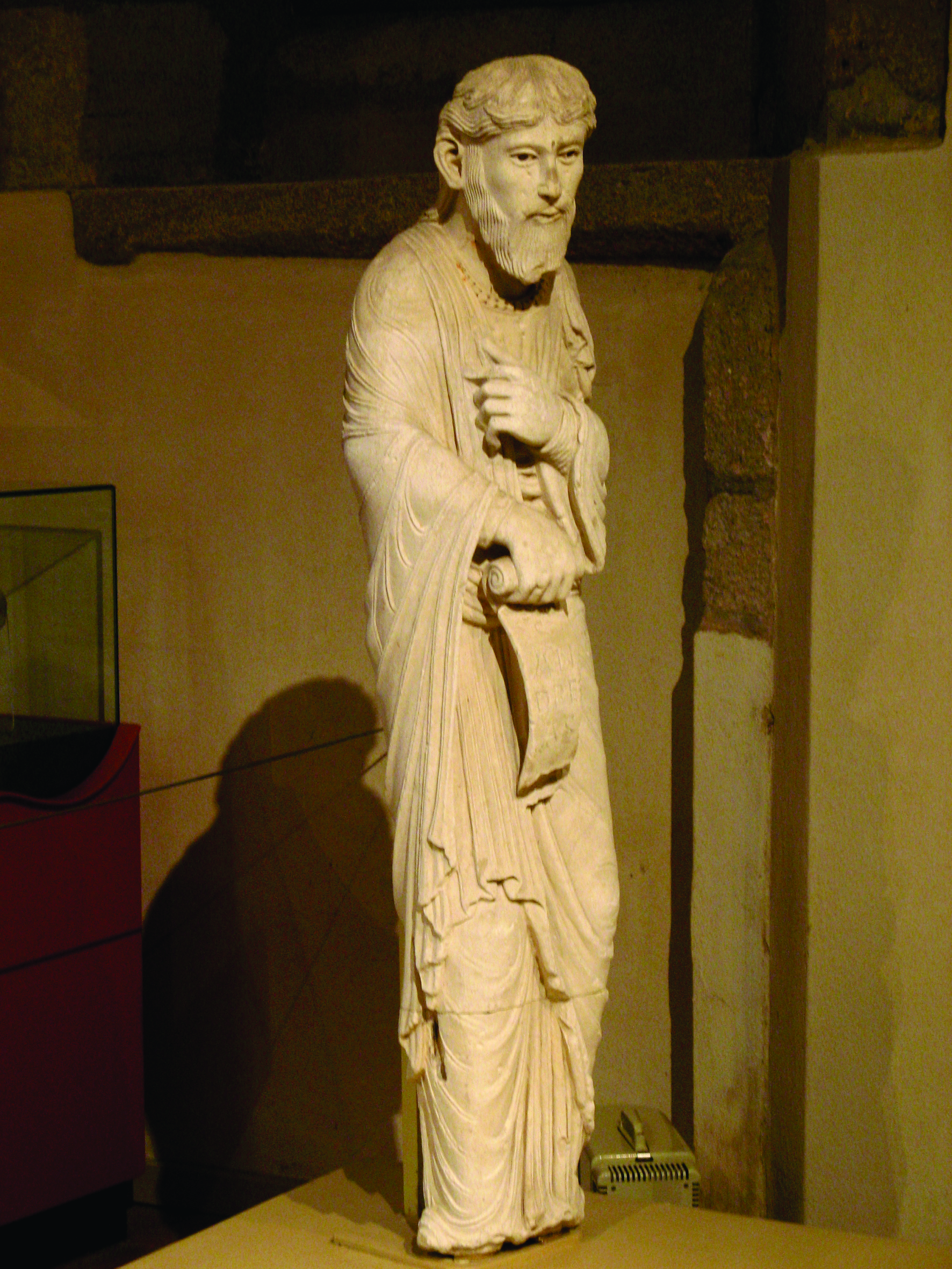
Le Moine Martin, Saint André (12th century)

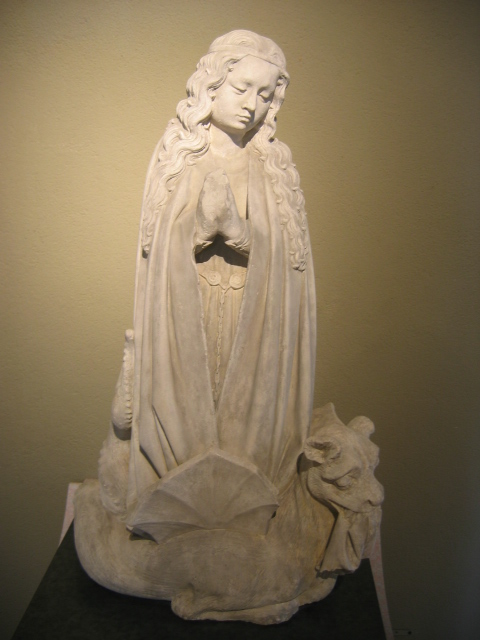
Sainte Marguerite (anonymous, 15th century)

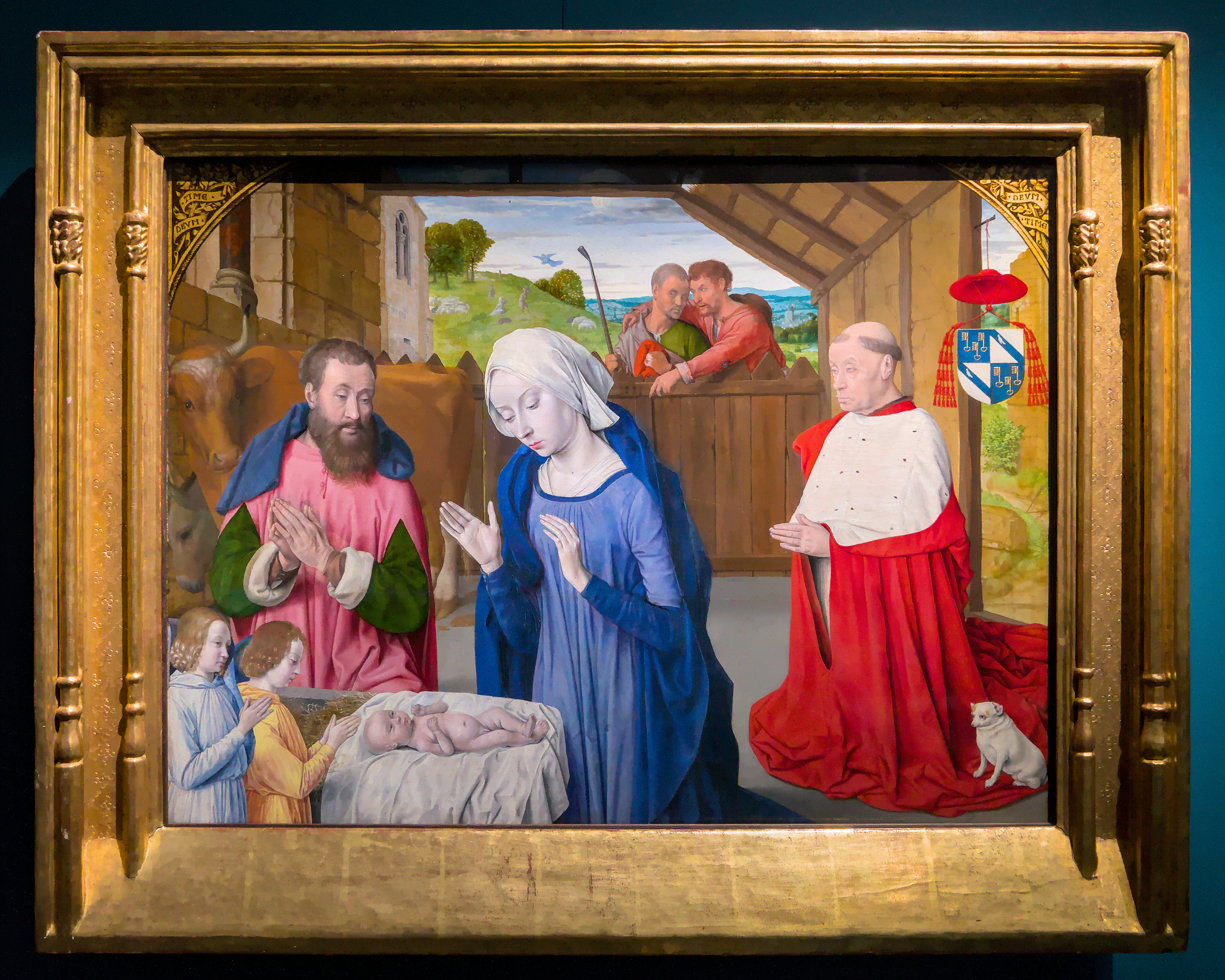
Le Maître de Moulins, Nativité au cardinal Rolin (circa 1480)

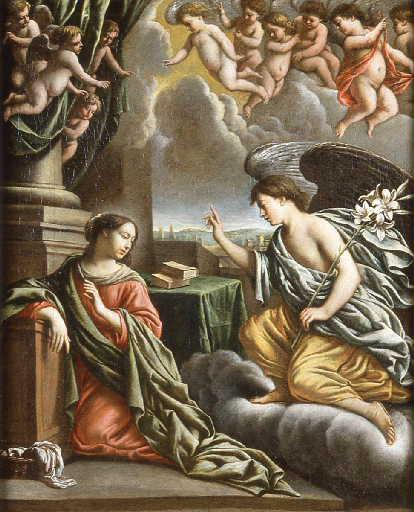
Mathieu Le Nain, Annunciation (17th century)

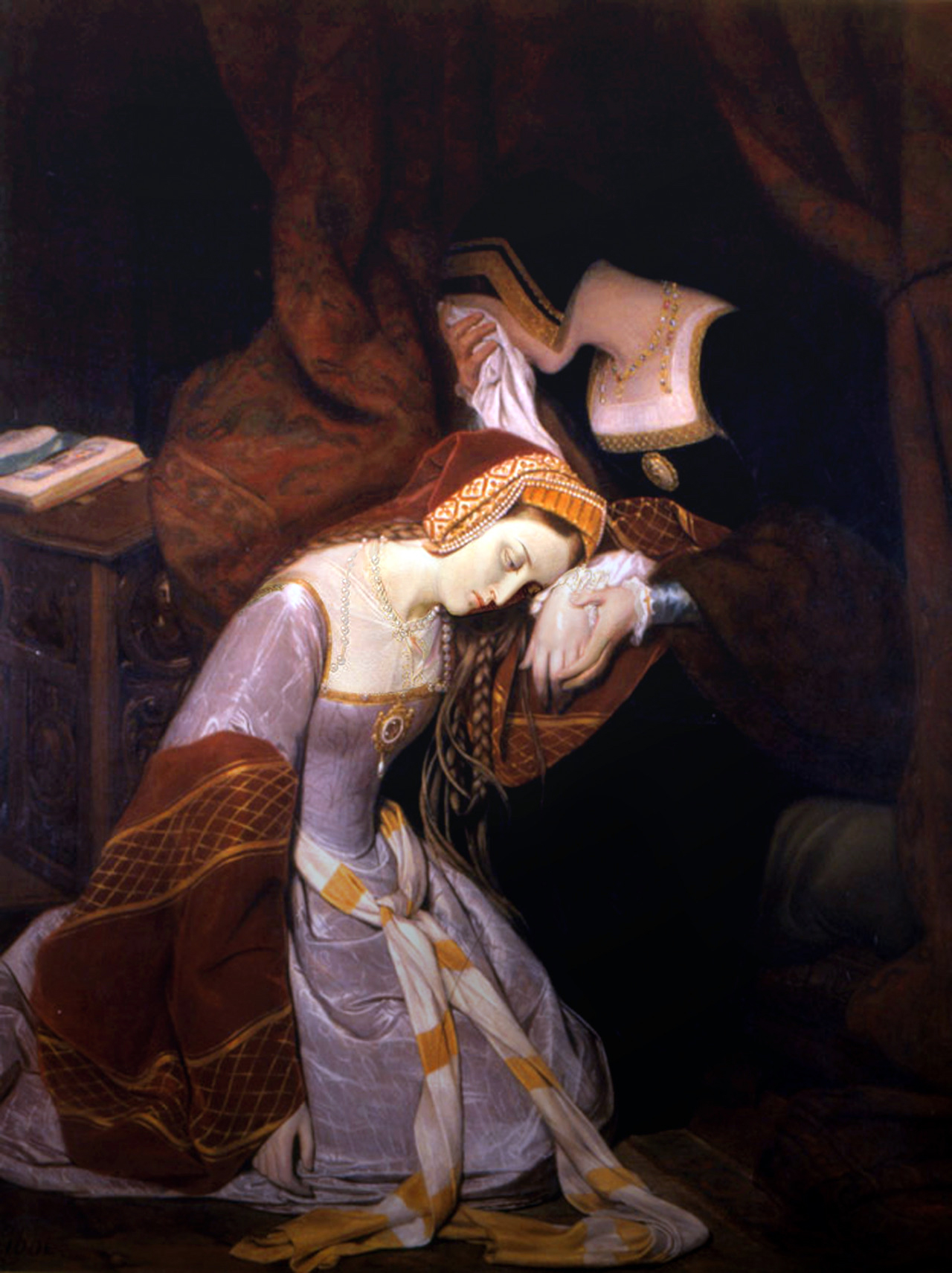
Édouard Cibot, Anne Boleyn in the Tower of London

== See also ==
- List of museums in France
