= Édouard Cibot =

French painter (1799–1877)

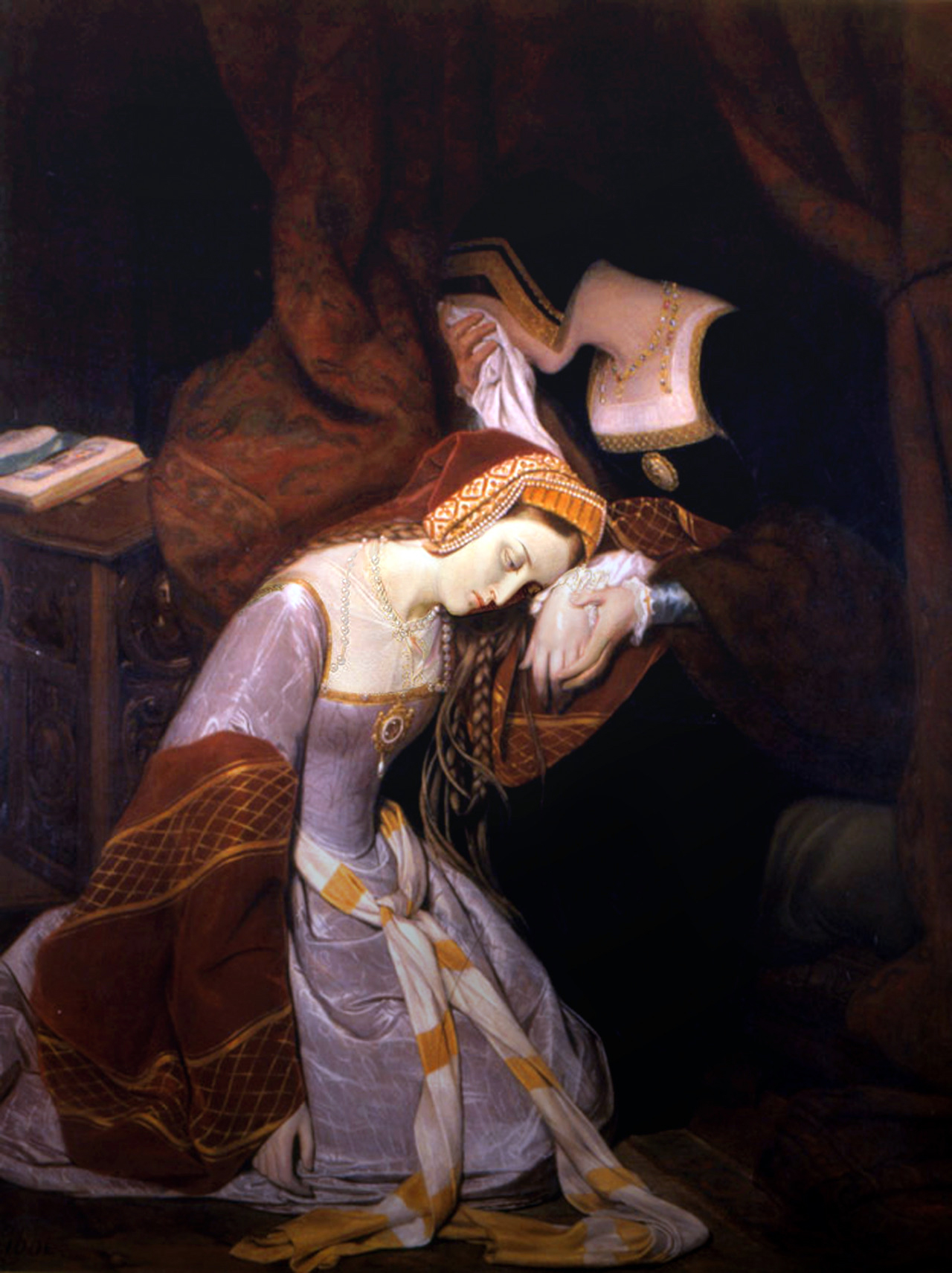
Anne Boleyn in the Tower of London, 1835, now in the Musée Rolin in Autun

François Barthélemy Michel Édouard Cibot (French: [edwaʁ sibɔ]; 1799–1877) was a French historical and landscape painter born in Paris. His masters were Guérin and Picot. During the first part of his career he devoted himself to historical painting, producing many sacred works, several specimens of which are to be seen in the churches of Paris. His most important work of this kind is the series of paintings representing Charity, in the church of St. Leu at Paris. About 1863 he applied himself to landscape painting. He died in Paris in 1877. Amongst his best works are:

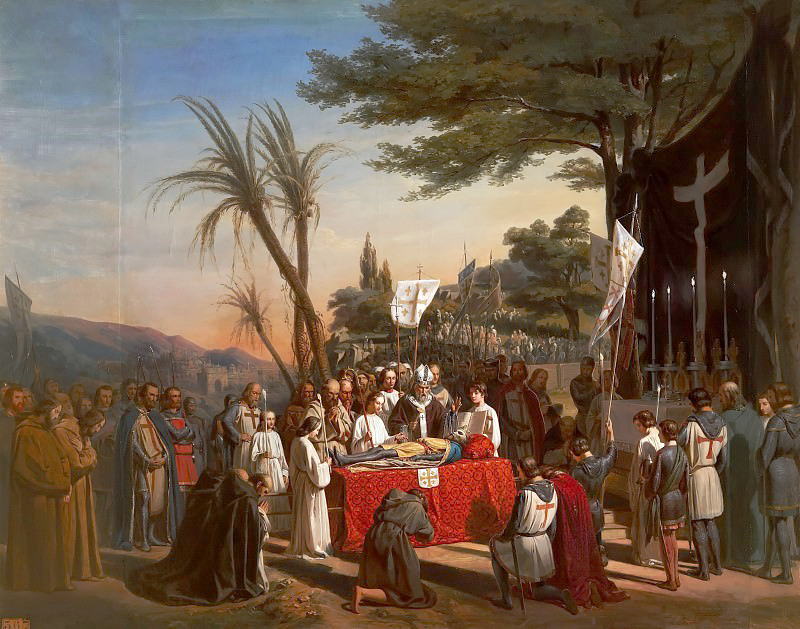
Funeral of Godfrey of Bouillon on the Mount of Calvary, at Jerusalem, 1828, now at the Palace of Versailles.

- The Loves of the Angels. 1835.
- Regina Coeli. 1846.
- St. Theresa. 1847.
- Convicts in 1788. 1836.
- Chestnut-trees at Aulnay. 1855.
- Park at Orsay. 1857.
- The Gouffre, near Seineport. 1864. (In the Luxembourg Gallery.)
- View at Soisy-sur-Ecolle. 1865.

== Gallery ==
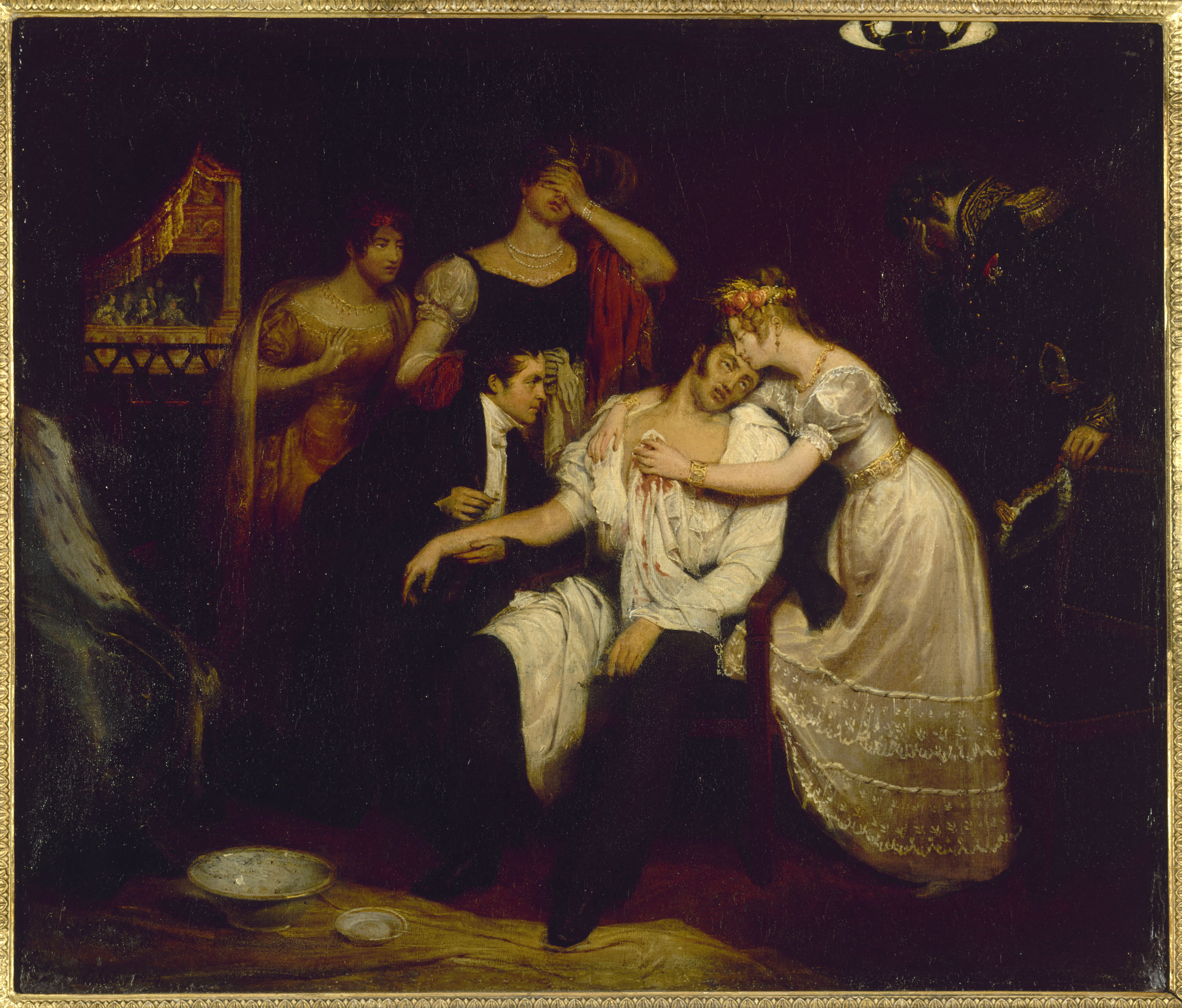
The Death of the Duke of Berry (1829)

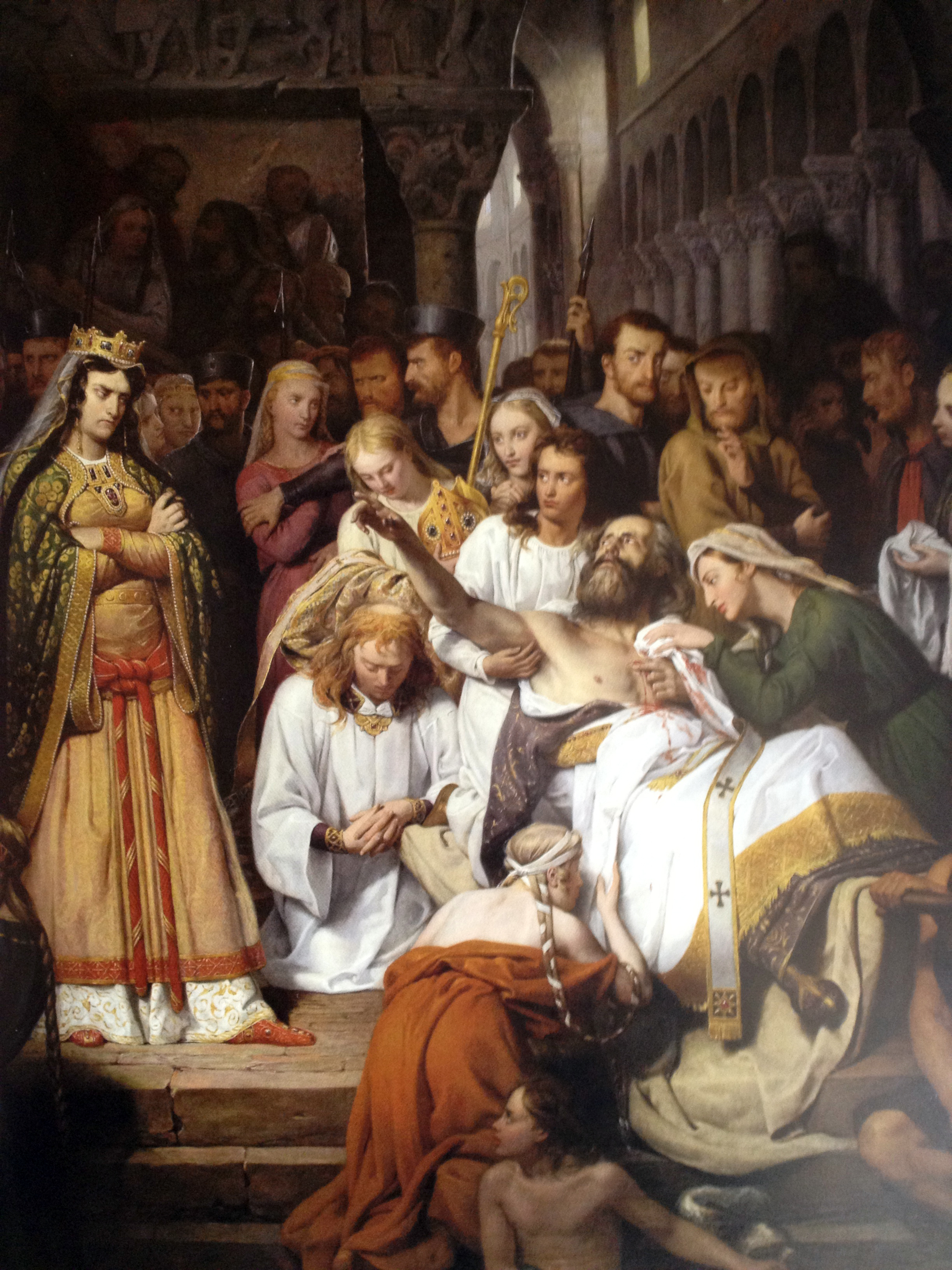
A Feature of Frédégonde's Life (1832)

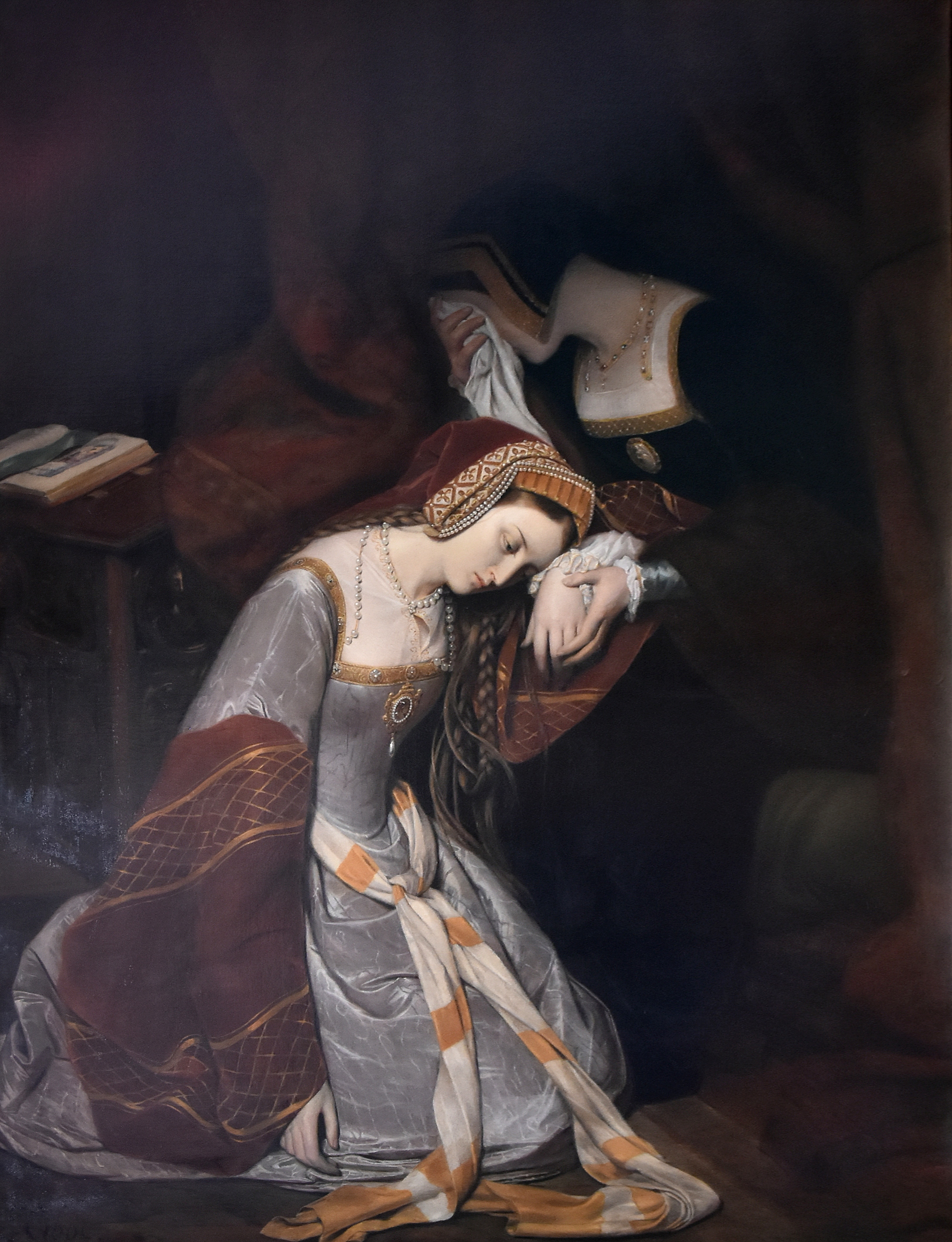
Anne Boleyn in the Tower of London (1835)

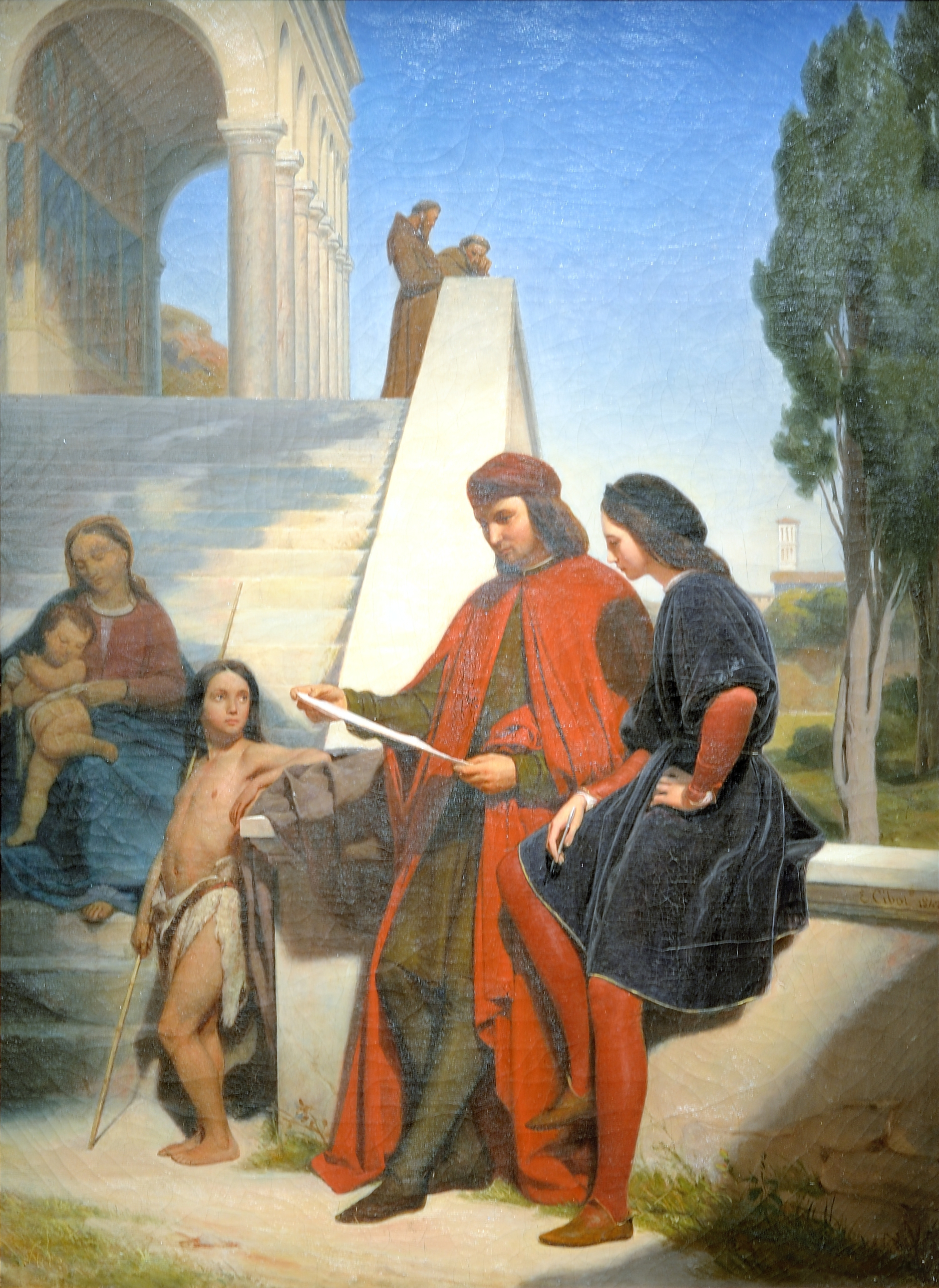
Le Pérugin and Raphaël in Pérouse (1842)

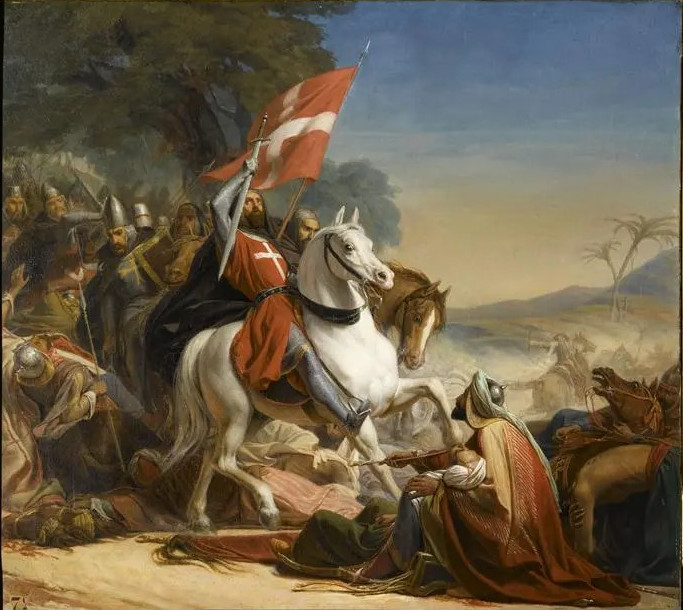
Defense of Celesyria by Raymond du Puy (1844)

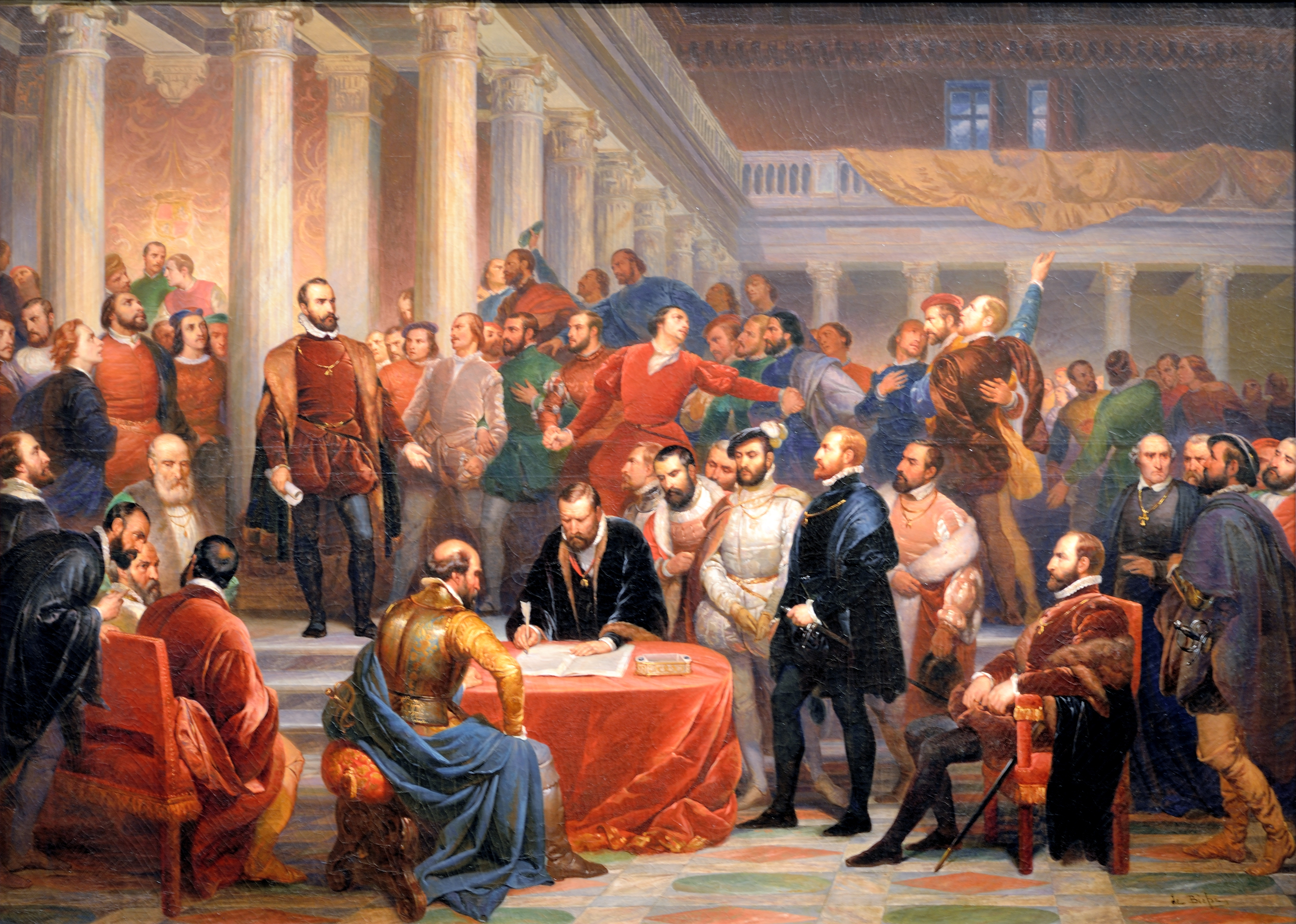
The Compromise of Nobles in 1566 (1849)
