= Moulins Cathedral =

Roman Catholic church in Moulins, Allier, France

Moulins Cathedral Basilique-Cathédrale Notre-Dame-l'Annonciation de Moulins
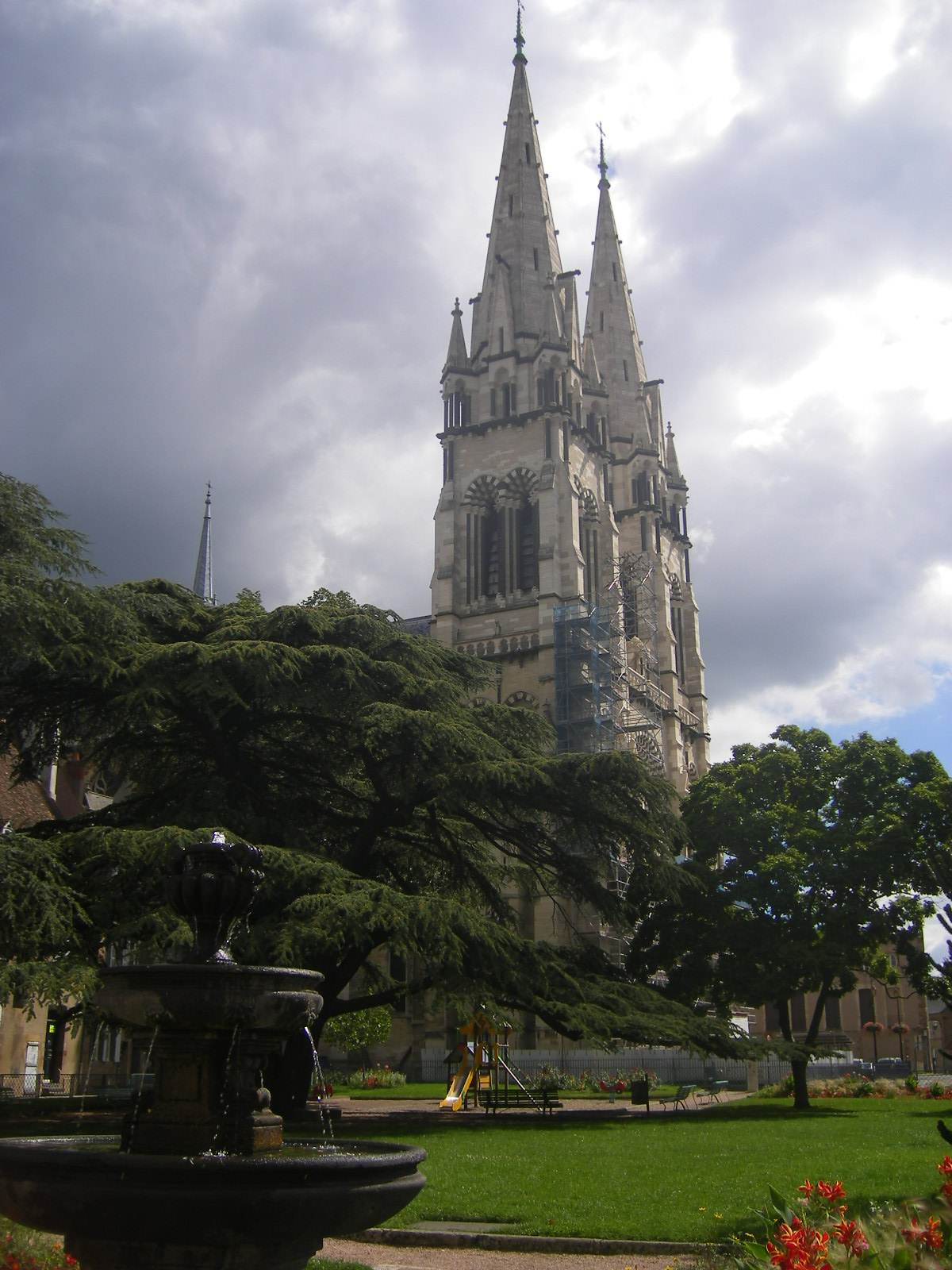
- Moulins Cathedral

Religion
- Affiliation: Roman Catholic
- Province: Diocese of Moulins
- Rite: Roman Rite
- Ecclesiastical or organisational status: Cathedral
- Status: Active

Location
- Location: Moulins, France
- Interactive map of Moulins Cathedral; Basilique-Cathédrale Notre-Dame-l'Annonciation de Moulins
- Coordinates: 46°34′0″N 3°19′54″E

Architecture
- Type: Church
- Style: Flamboyant Gothic, Neo-Gothic
- Groundbreaking: 15th century
- Completed: 19th century

Website
- https://paroisse-notredamedemoulins.catholique-moulins.fr

Moulins Cathedral (French: Basilique-Cathédrale Notre-Dame-de-l'Annonciation de Moulins, lit. 'Cathedral Basilica of Our Lady of the Annunciation of Moulins') is a Roman Catholic church located in the town of Moulins, Allier, France. It is also known as Notre-Dame de Moulins.

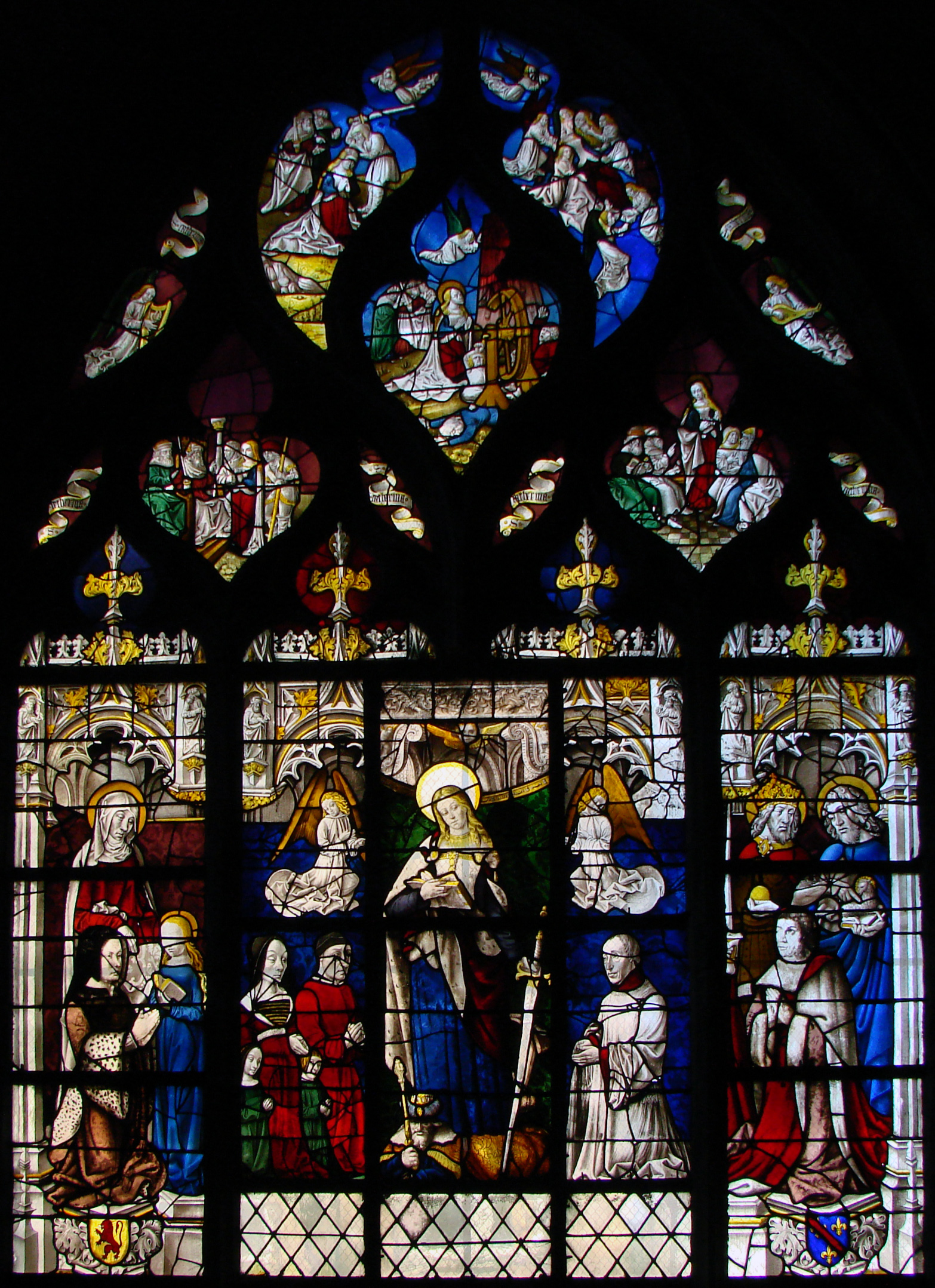
Stained glass window in the cathedral, dating from the end of the 15th century.

The cathedral is the seat of the Bishop of Moulins. It is a national monument.

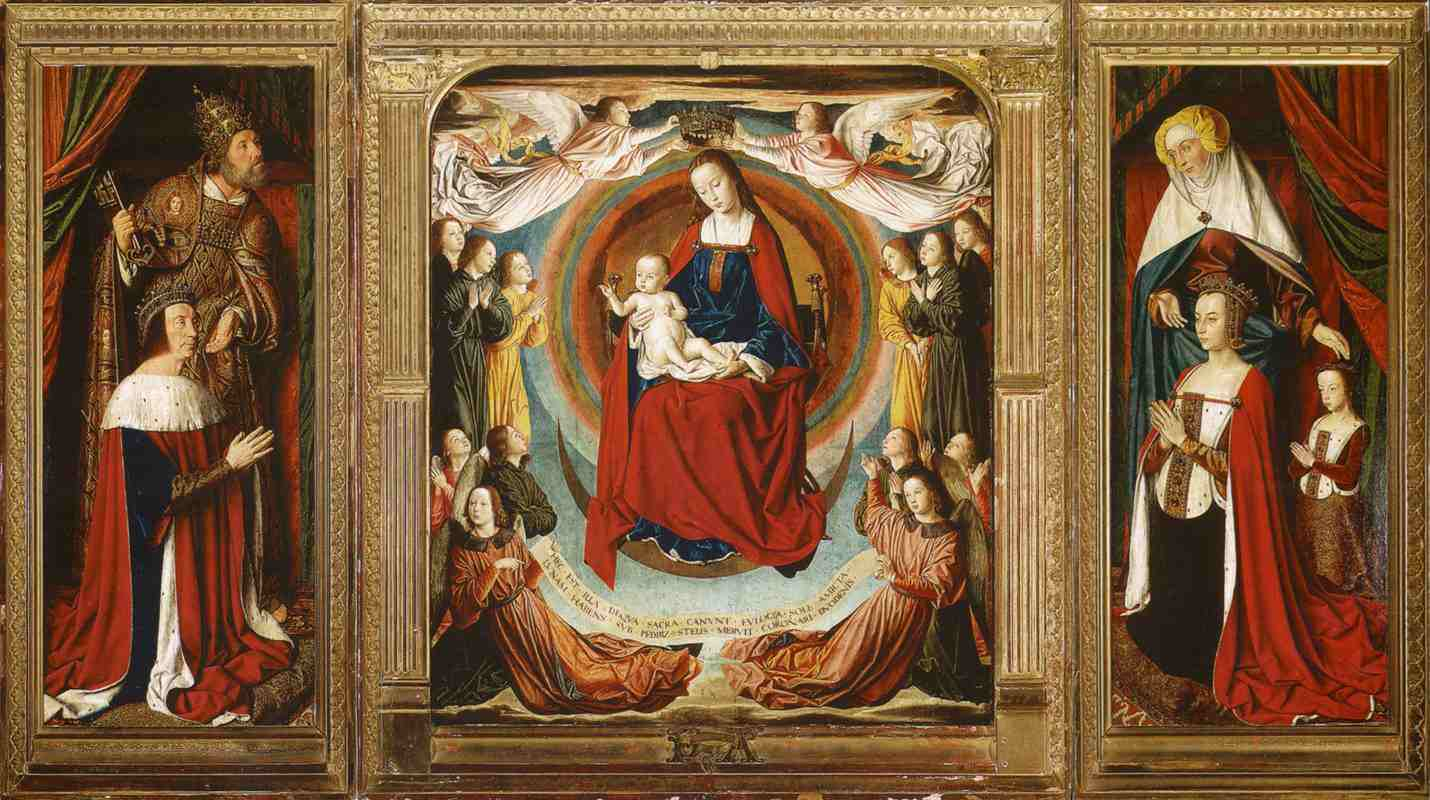
The Moulins triptych by the Maître de Moulins inside the cathedral

The cathedral contains two distinct building phases four centuries apart. It was constructed as a collegiate church in the Flamboyant style at the end of the 15th century. In 1822 it was made a cathedral. To this a neo-Gothic nave, designed by the architects Lassus and Millet, was added at the end of the 19th century.

The treasury contains the famous triptych by the Maître de Moulins, which was commissioned around 1500 by the Duke of Bourbon.
