= Nativity with a Portrait of Cardinal Jean Roulin =

1480 painting

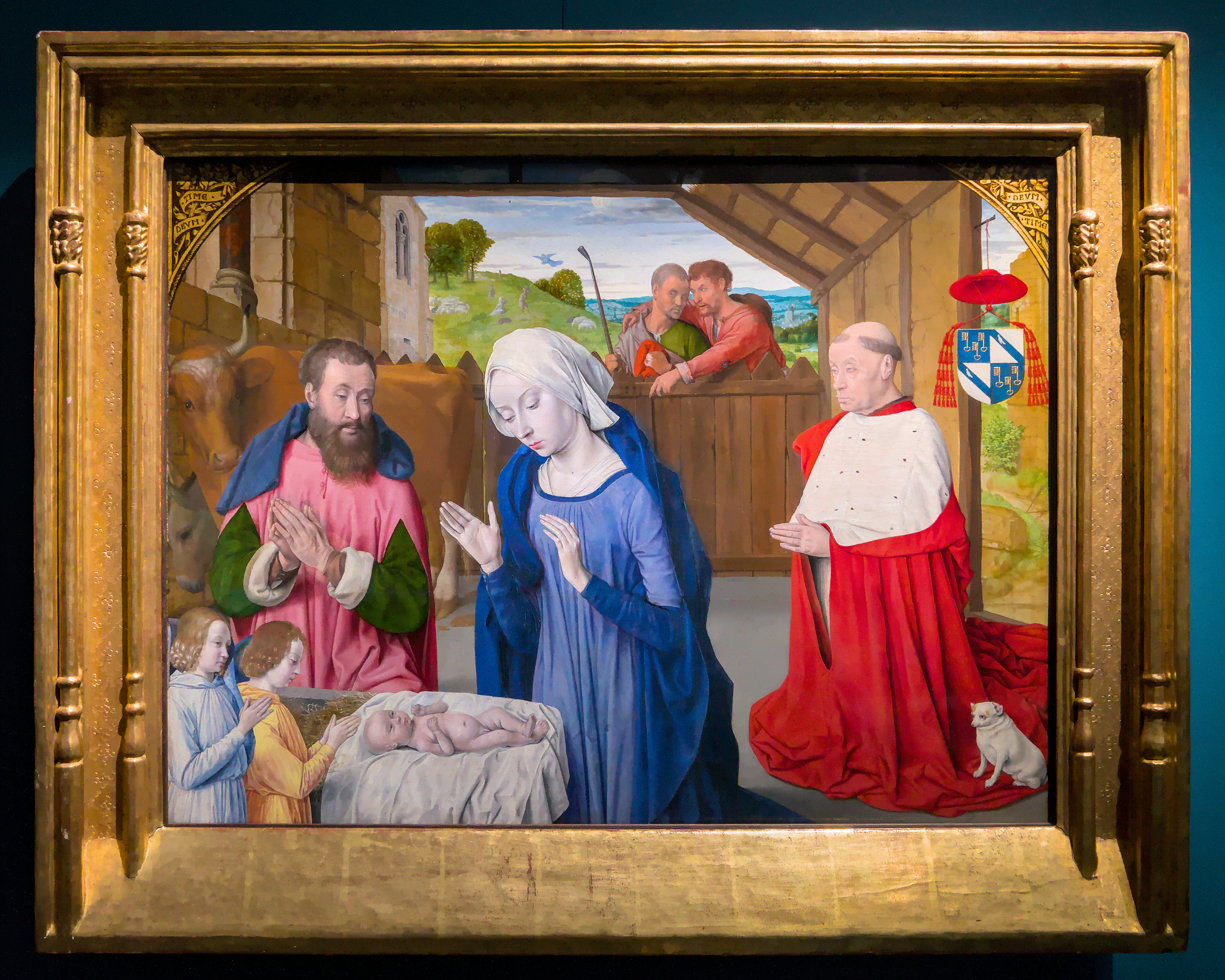

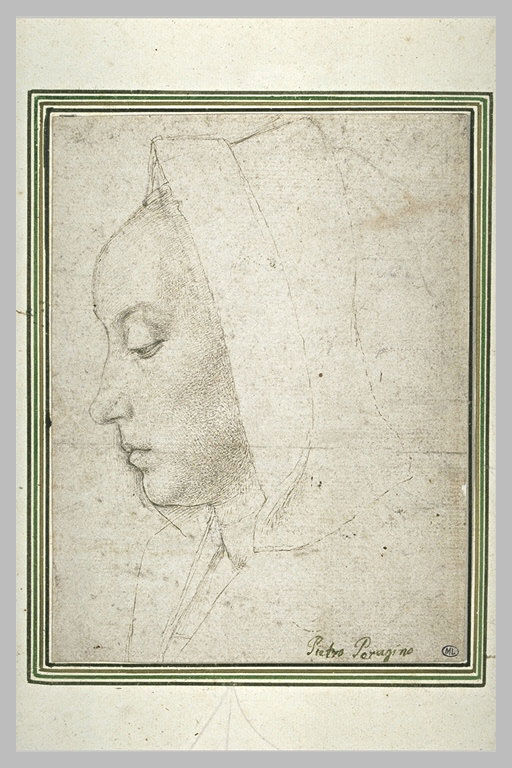
Profile of a Woman, c.1480 drawing by Jean Hey, known as the Master of Moulins (Louvre, inv RF 31039).

Nativity with a Portrait of Cardinal Jean Roulin (also known as Nativity with Jean Roulin, Nativity of the Master of Moulins or Nativity of Autun) is a 1480 oil on panel painting, previously attributed to the anonymous Master of Moulins, who is now thought to be Jean Hey. The cardinal was one of the Master's protectors and this is his earliest surviving work. It was commissioned by the cardinal three years before his death and is now in the musée Rolin (the birthplace of the cardinal's father Nicolas).

== Description ==
The cardinal is shown wearing a cardinal's ermine mozetta and red cape, with his galero above his coat of arms behind him. The dog by him is symbolic of fidelity, whilst the whiteness of the veil and face of Mary, the ermine and the dog's fur refers to purity and the red of the robe to Christ's Passion. The Virgin Mary is shown with far whiter skin than the other people, showing her noble and their common origins. Two gilded wood details in the top left and top right corners bear the inscriptions "Deum Time" and "Time Deum" (fear God).

It is in the Flemish primitive style: blueish hills in the background, shepherds talking to each other, the size of figures still in hierarchical proportion (the Virgin is the biggest, as shown by the angels leaning over the cradle), despite the advanced sensibilities of the Northern Renaissance. The Virgin's face is similar to Profile of a Woman, now in the Louvre. The fence on which the shepherds lean has stakes with damaged or sharpened points, as in Fra Angelico's 1443 Annunciation.

== Loans ==
- France 1500, entre Moyen Âge et Renaissance
  - 6 October 2010 to 10 January 2011, Grand Palais de Paris.
  - 27 February to 30 May 2011, Art Institute of Chicago

== Bibliography (in French) ==
- J. M. Raulin, La Nativité d'Autun et quelques autres portraits de la famille du chancelier de Bourgogne, Nicolas Rolin, 1911
- Philippe Lorentz, Les Rolin et les « Primitifs flamands» , Picard, 1999.
- Marie-Aude Albert, La Vierge dans l’Art. La Nativité d’Autun, Revue Reconquête No. 294
- Elsig, Frédéric (2004). La peinture en France au 15th century. Galerie des arts. Milan: 5 Continents Éditions. ISBN 88-7439-113-7. BNF: 399892952.
- Élisabeth Taburet-Delahaye, Genevièv Bresc-Bautier and Thierry Crépin-Leblond (ed.s) (2010). France 1500 : Entre Moyen Age et Renaissance: Catalogue de l'exposition du Grand Palais à Paris, 6 octobre 2010-10 janvier 2011. Paris: Réunion des Musées nationaux. ISBN 978-2-7118-5699-2..
- Elliot Adam, « Un tableau de Jean Hey à Autun : la Nativité du cardinal Jean Rolin et les peintres de Dijon », in Brigitte Maurice-Chabard, Sophie Jugie and Jacques Paviot (ed.s), Miroir du Prince. La commande artistique des hauts fonctionnaires à la cour de Bourgogne (1425-1510), Gand, Snoeck, 2021, 287 p. (ISBN 978-9461616135), p. 209-212
