= Anne Boleyn in the Tower of London =

Painting by Édouard Cibot

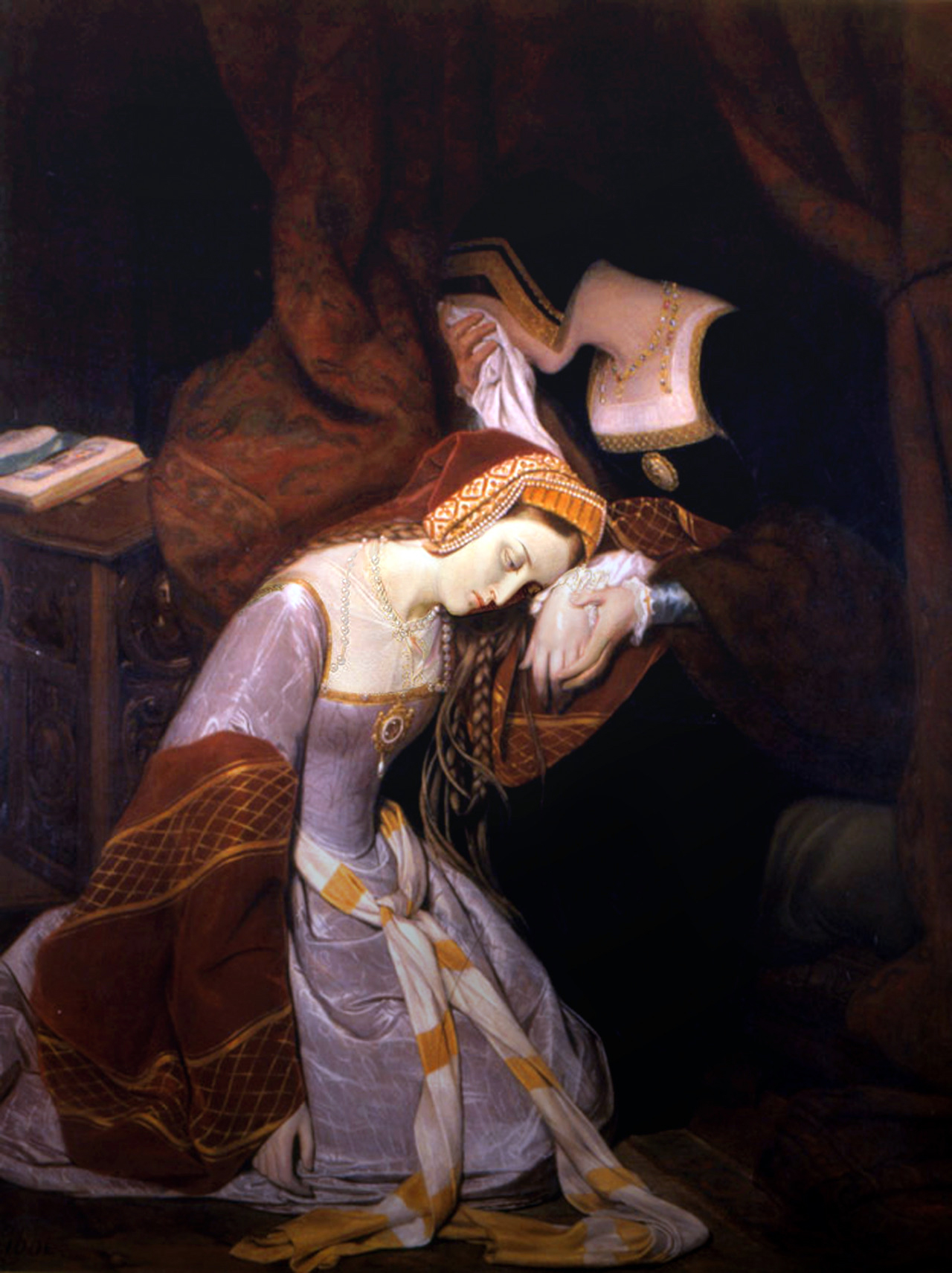
Anne Boleyn in the Tower of London (1835) by Édouard Cibot

Anne Boleyn in the Tower of London or Anne Boleyn in the Tower of London Early in her Imprisonment is an oil on canvas painting by Édouard Cibot, from 1835. It was exhibited at that the Paris Salon of 1835. It is now held in the Musée Rolin, in Autun.

In 2014 it was lent to the Museum of Fine Arts of Lyon for the exhibition L'invention du Passé. Histoires de cœur et d'épée 1802-1850, then in 2015 to the musée du Luxembourg for Les Tudors.
