= Annunciation (Le Nain) =

Painting by Mathieu Le Nain, c. 1660

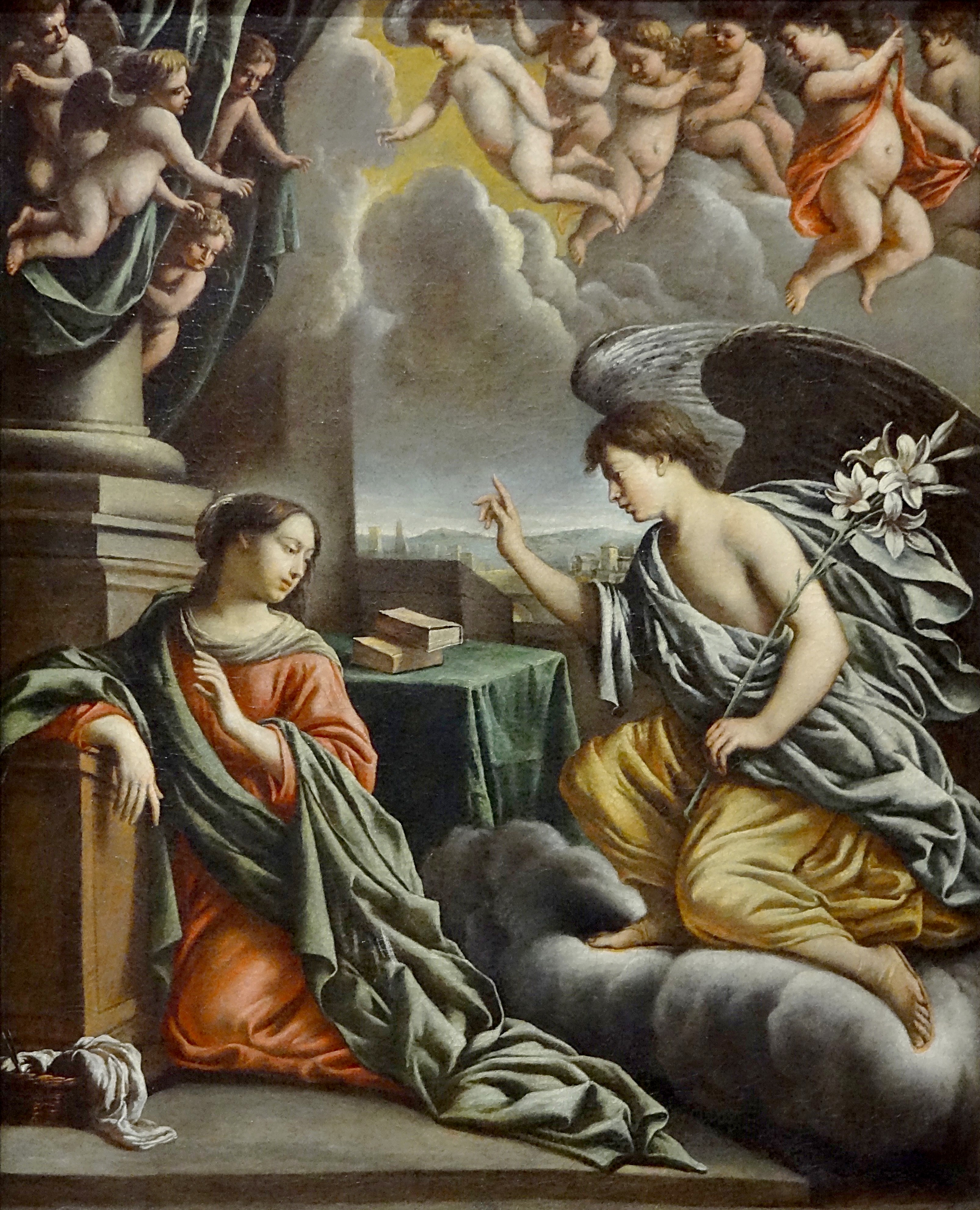
Annunciation (c. 1660) by Mathieu Le Nain

Annunciation is an unsigned oil on canvas painting of the Annunciation by Mathieu Le Nain, from c. 1660. It is held in the Musée Rolin, in Autun.

It was re-discovered by chance in a small church in Colombier-en-Brionnais in 1986 by an art and antiquities curator from Isère and moved to the town hall, where Louvre specialists confirmed its attribution to Le Nain. It was made a Monument Historique in on 21 July 1987 and acquired by its present owner.
