= Jean Hey =

Early Netherlandish painter (fl. 1475 –1505)

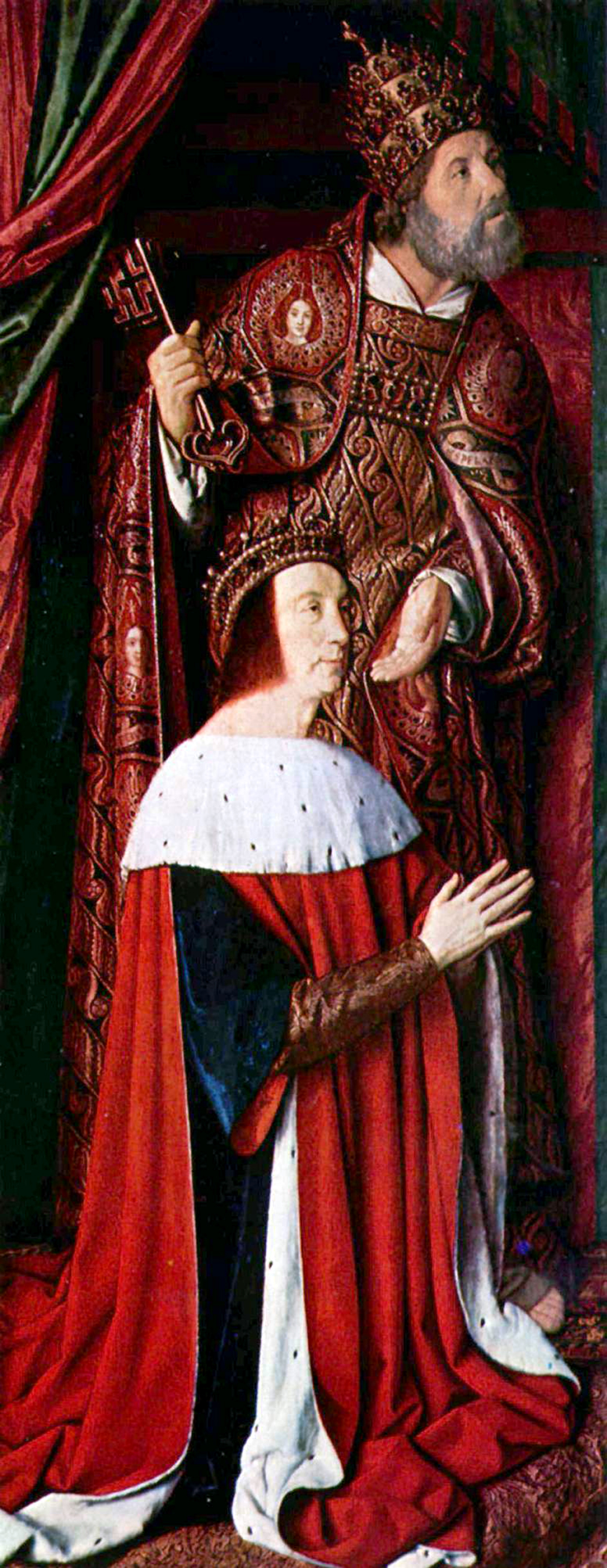
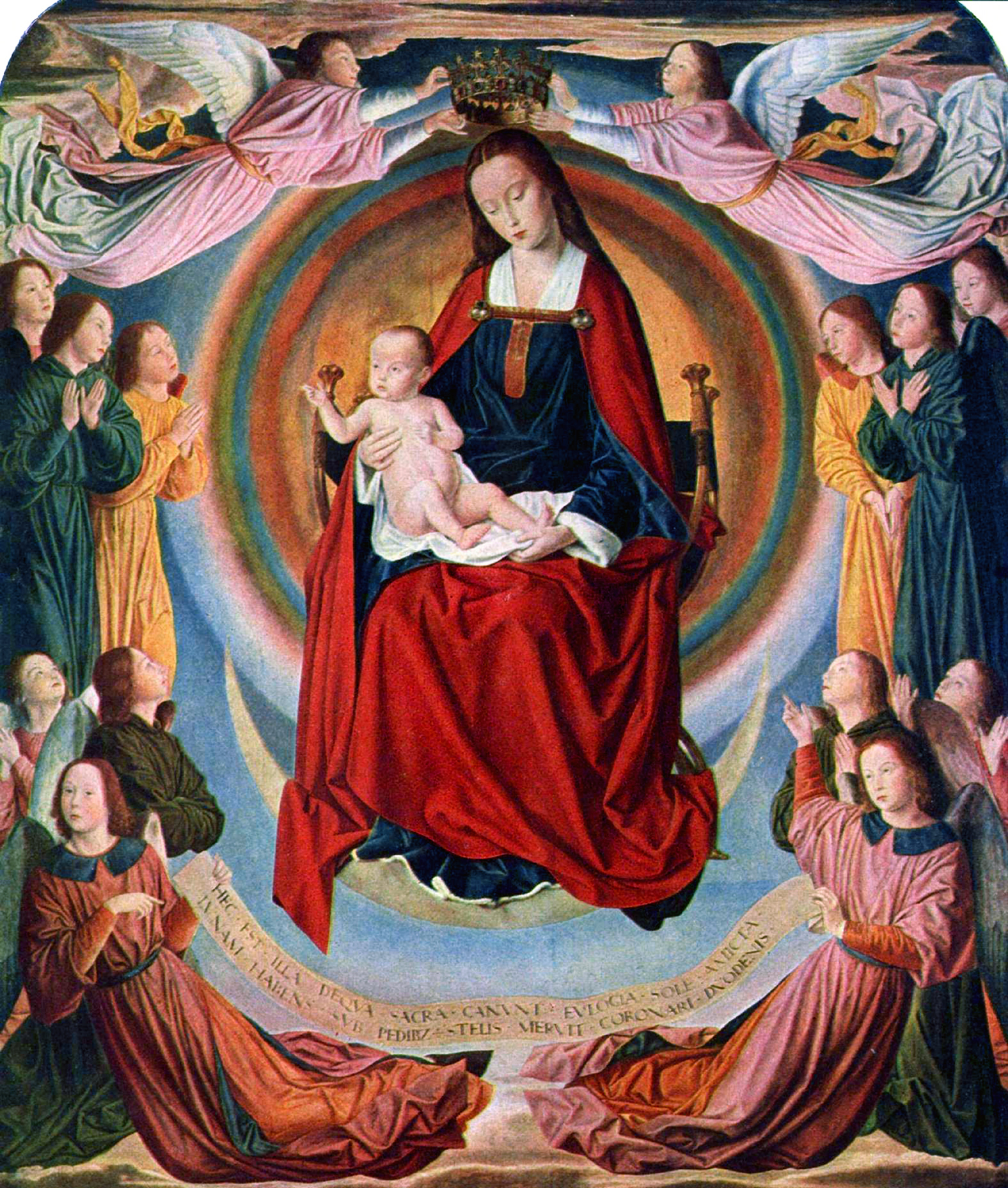
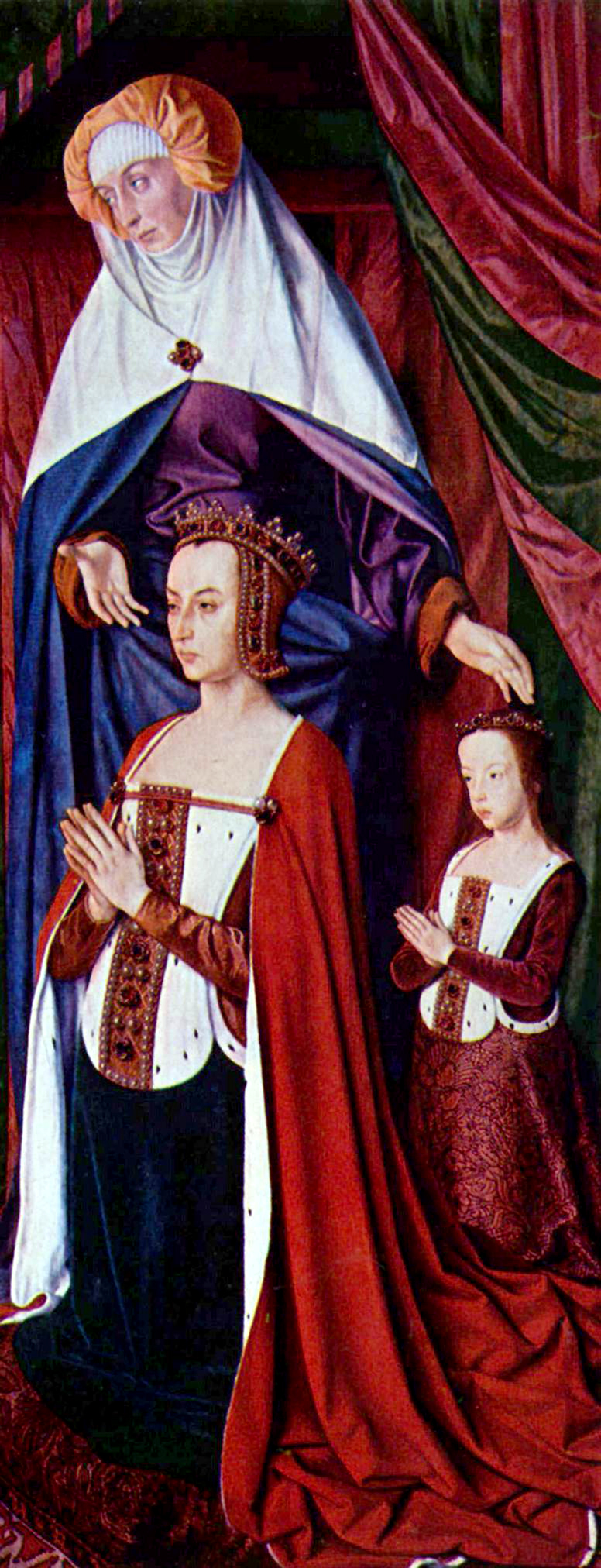

The Moulins Triptych, c. 1498, oil on panel, Moulins Cathedral

Jean Hey (or Jean Hay) (fl. c. 1475 – c. 1505), now generally identified with the artist formerly known as the Master of Moulins, was an Early Netherlandish painter working in France and the Duchy of Burgundy, and associated with the court of the Dukes of Bourbon.

== Life and works ==
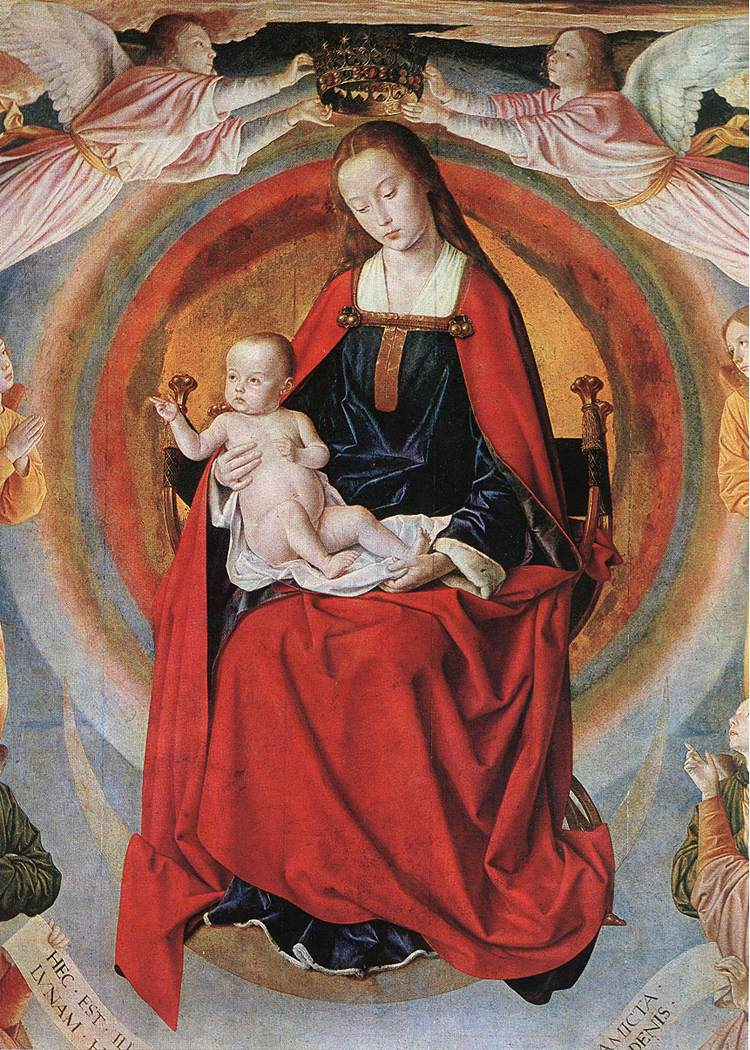
The Moulins Triptych (detail of central panel)

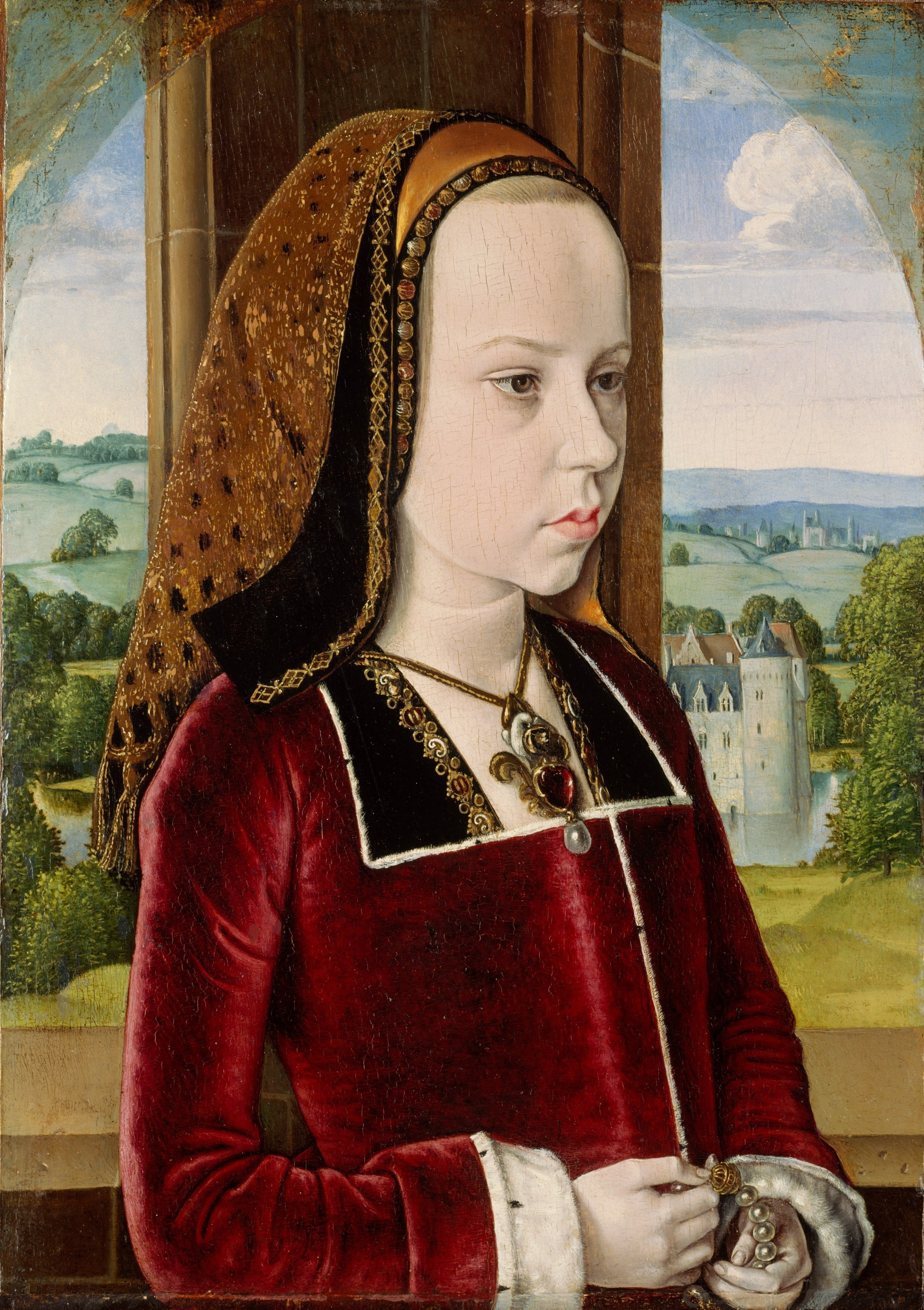
Margaret of Austria

Little is known about Hey, whose style has led to speculation that he may have studied under Hugo van der Goes. It is possible that he spent his last years in Paris.

Hey's most well-known work, the triptych in Moulins Cathedral, dates from the end of 15th century. The central panel shows the Madonna and Child adored by angels, and is flanked by portraits of the duke Pierre II and the duchess Anne de Beaujeu with their daughter Suzanne. The triptych's state of preservation is generally excellent, although at some time before the 1830s the top and bottom of the wings were trimmed (the left wing more at the bottom and the right wing more at the top).

== Identifying the Master of Moulins ==
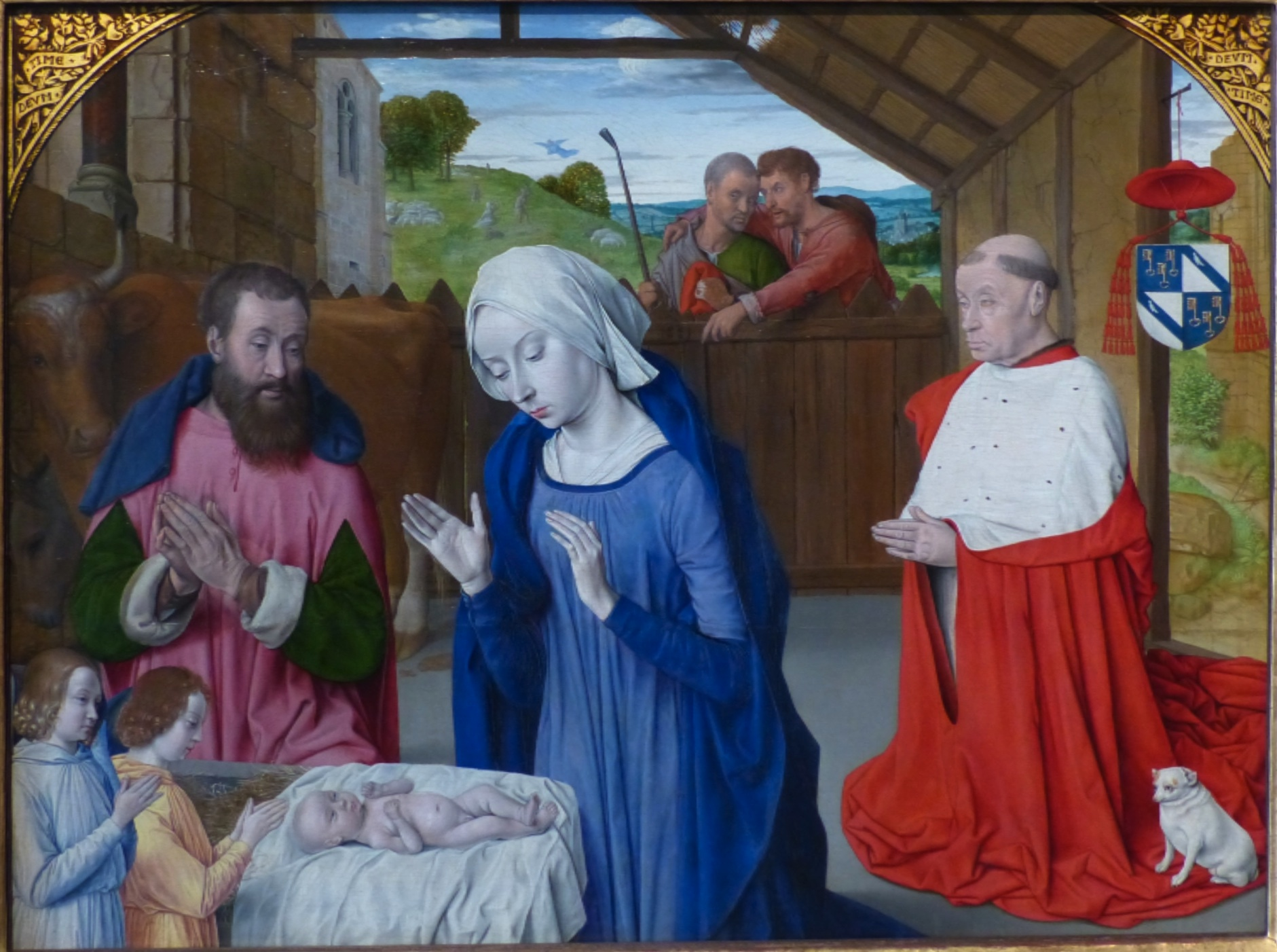
Nativity with donor portrait of Cardinal Rolin

Until the 1902 Exposition des primitifs flamands à Bruges, the name of the painter of the Moulins Triptych was unknown, although art historians identified a number of other works that were evidently by the same hand. Georges Hulin de Loo first made the connection between this artist and a Jehan Pérreal de Paris when he compared the drapery and sleeves of the Mary Magdalene lent from the Léon de Somzee collection, to the Moulins triptych.

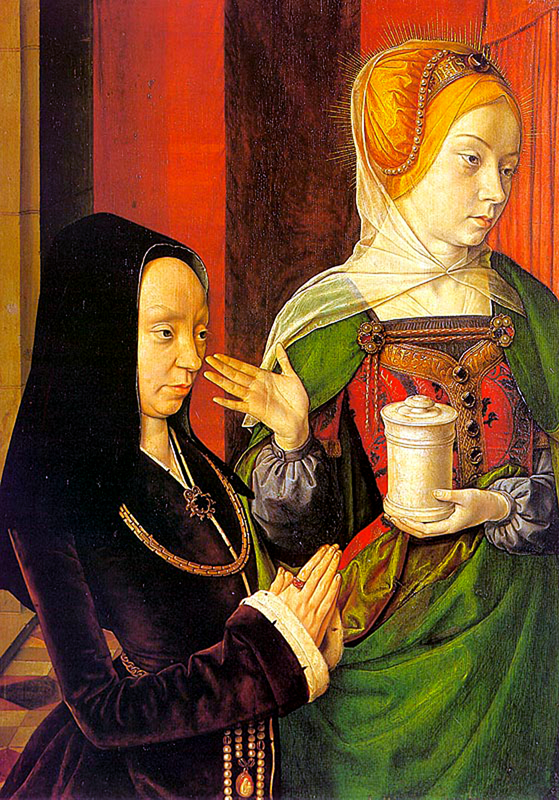
Mary Magdalene from the Somzee collection in the 1902 exhibition

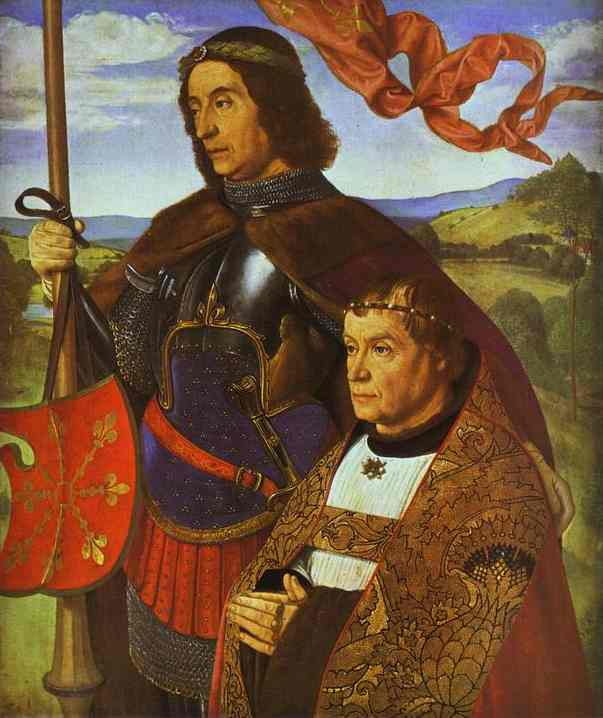
Portrait of Francis de Chateaubriand, also on loan from Glasgow to the 1902 exhibition

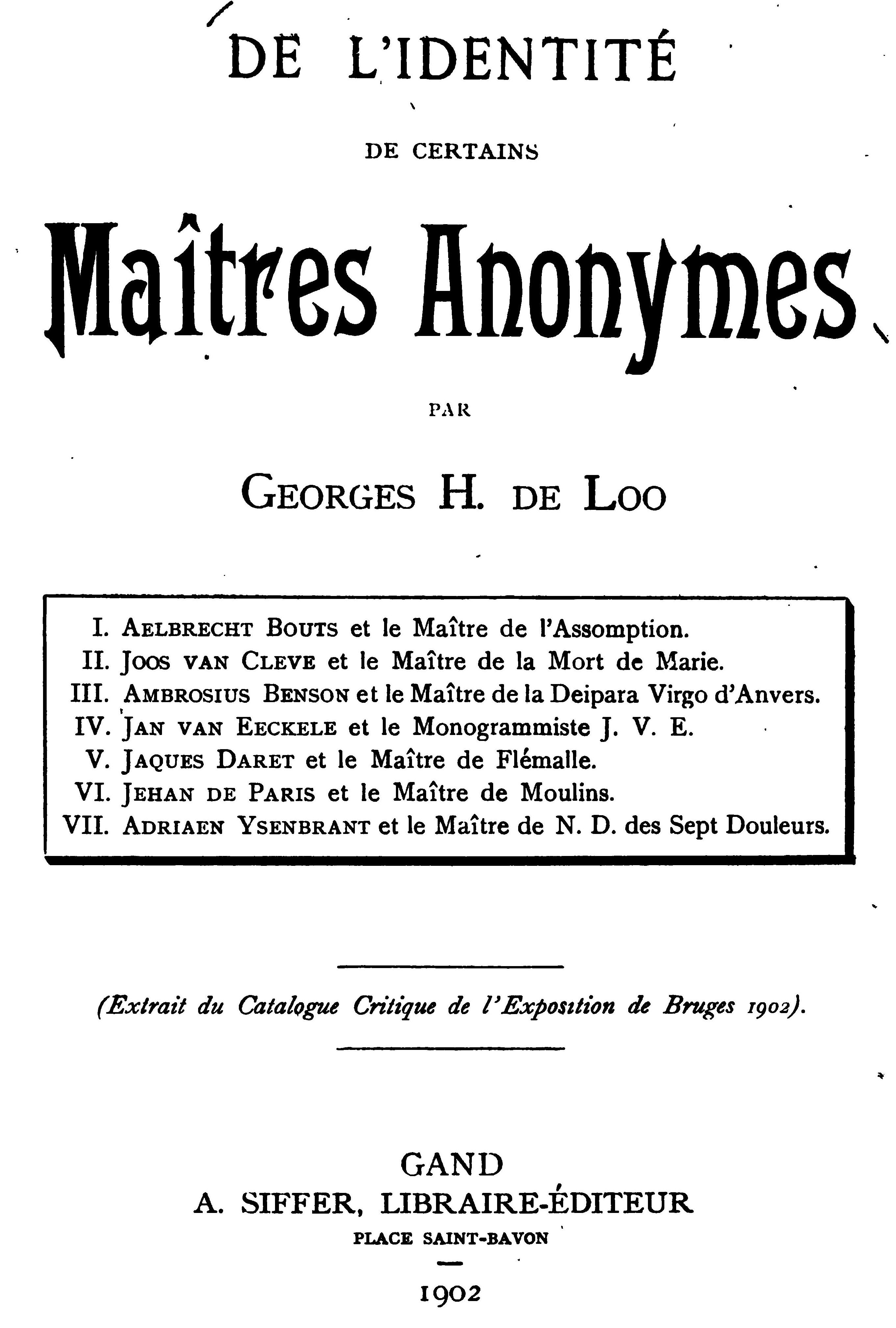
Extract of Hulin de Loo's critical catalog with his anonymous master identifications

The first monograph on the Master of Moulins, written in 1961 by Madeleine Huillet d'Istria, argued that this artist did not actually exist, and that more than 12 different artists were responsible for the corpus of works traditionally ascribed to him. The Master's identity was established after an inscription was found on the reverse of a damaged painting, Christ with Crown of Thorns (1494) in the Royal Museums of Fine Arts of Belgium, Brussels, identifying the artist as Jean Hey, teutonicus and pictor egregius ("the famous painter"), and identifying the patron as Jean Cueillette, who was secretary to the King and an associate of the Bourbon family. Stylistic similarities link this painting to the works attributed to the Master of Moulins. The Master of Moulins appears to have been the court painter for the Bourbons, and from a surviving account for 1502–03, it is clear that the court painter's name was Jean; other candidates once considered plausible, such as Jean Perréal and Jean Prévost (an artist from Lyon who worked in stained glass), have proven untenable in the light of subsequent research. The term "Teutonicus", or "German" included Flemings at this date.

Master of Moulins

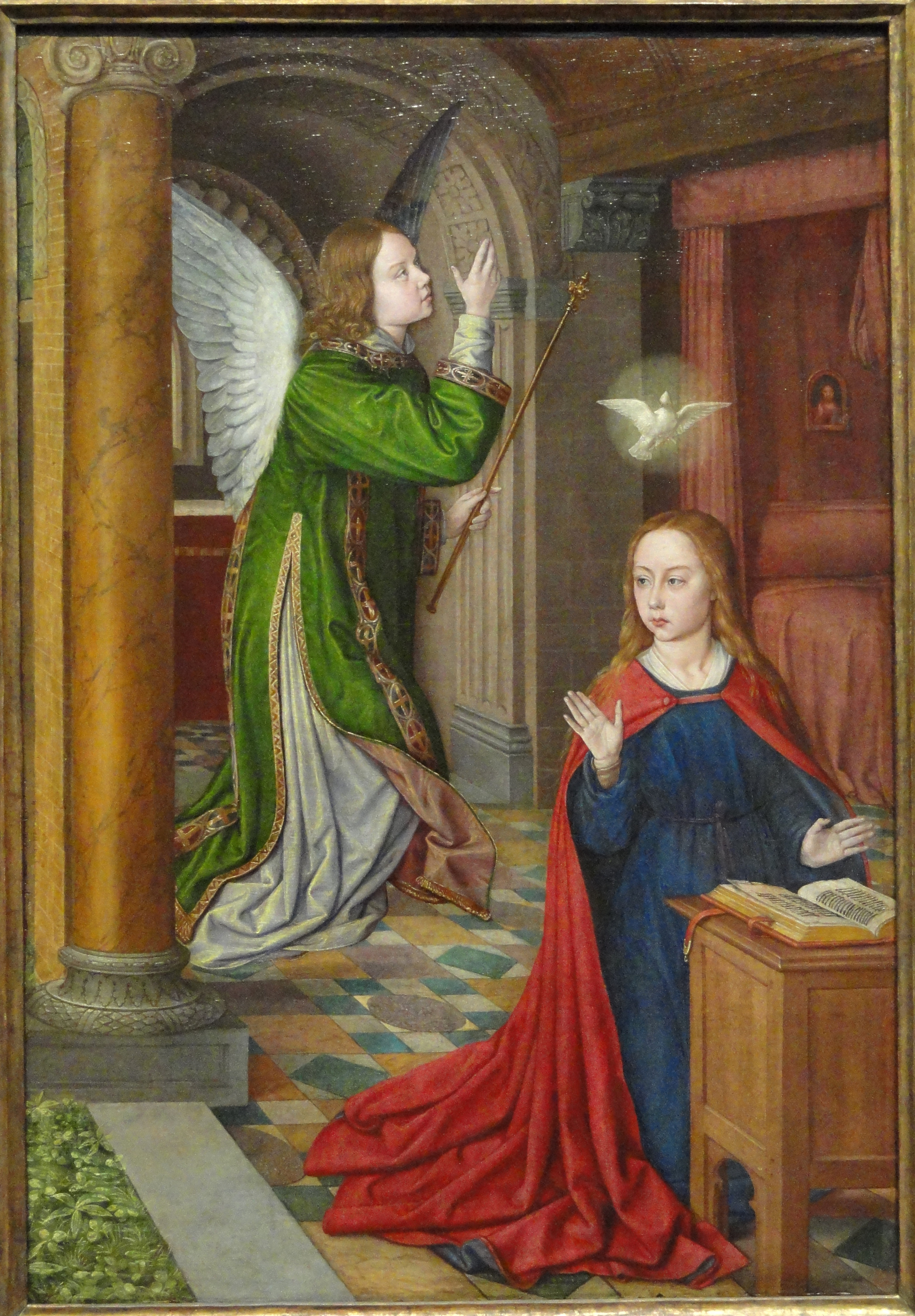
The Annunciation, 1490–1495, Art Institute of Chicago

Portrait of Charles II of Bourbon

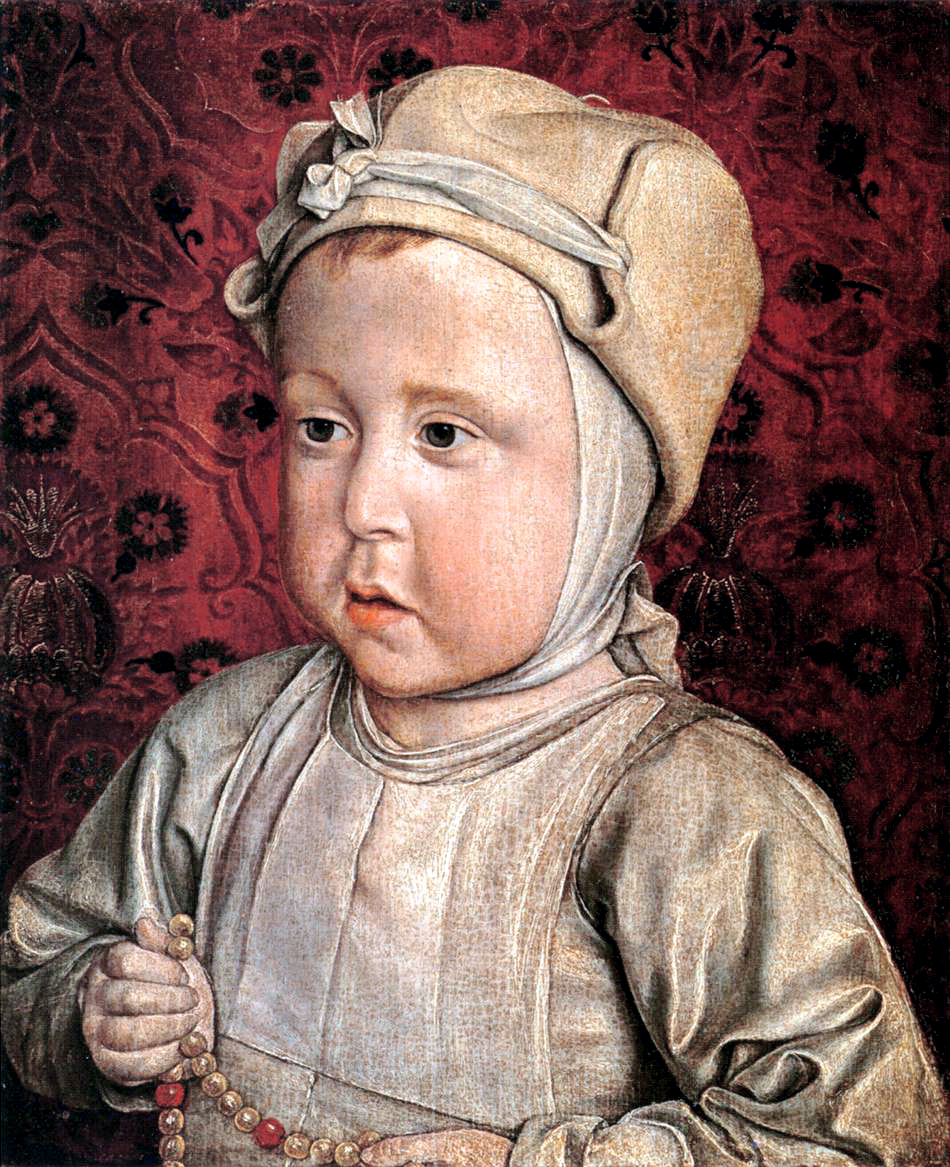
Le dauphin Charles Orlando, Dauphin of France, 1494

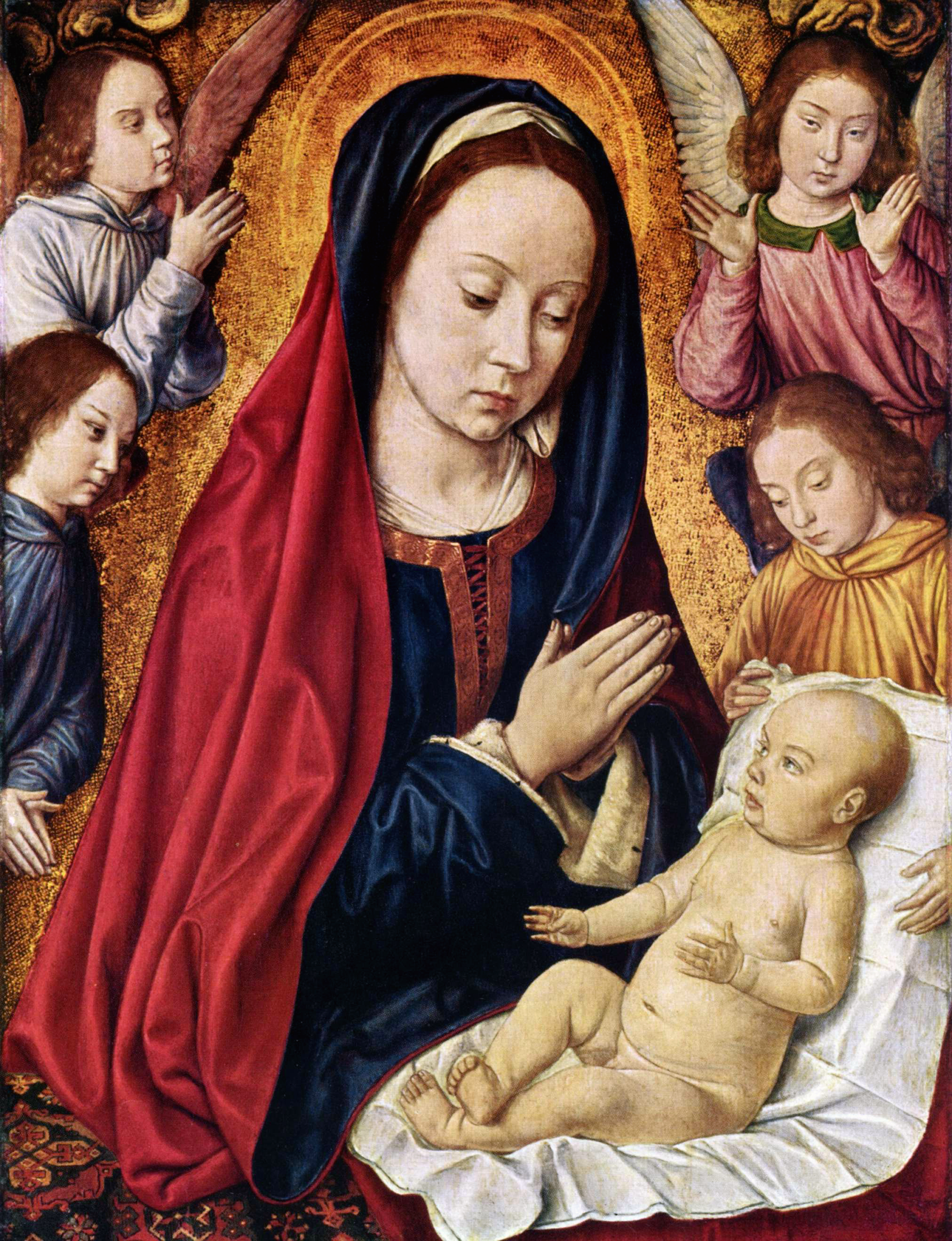
The Virgin and the Child

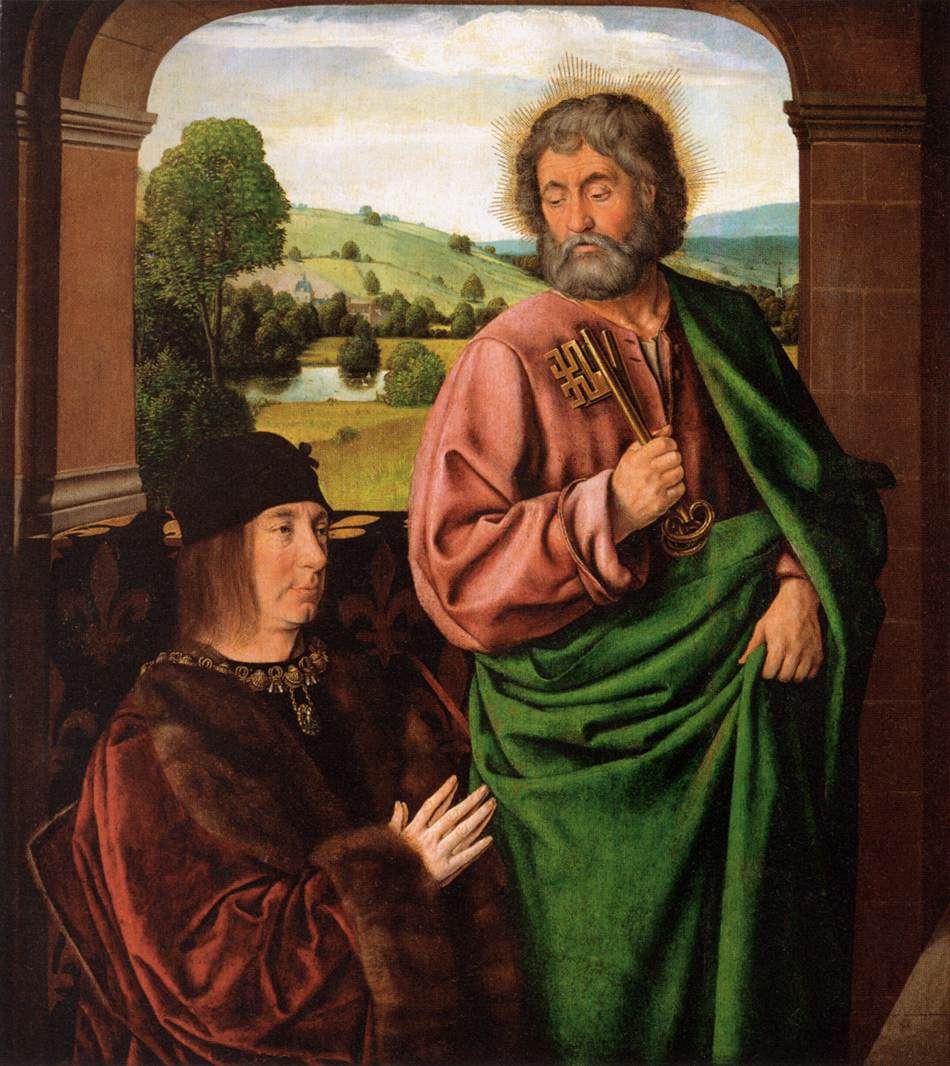
Pierre II, Duc de Bourbon, Presented by St Peter

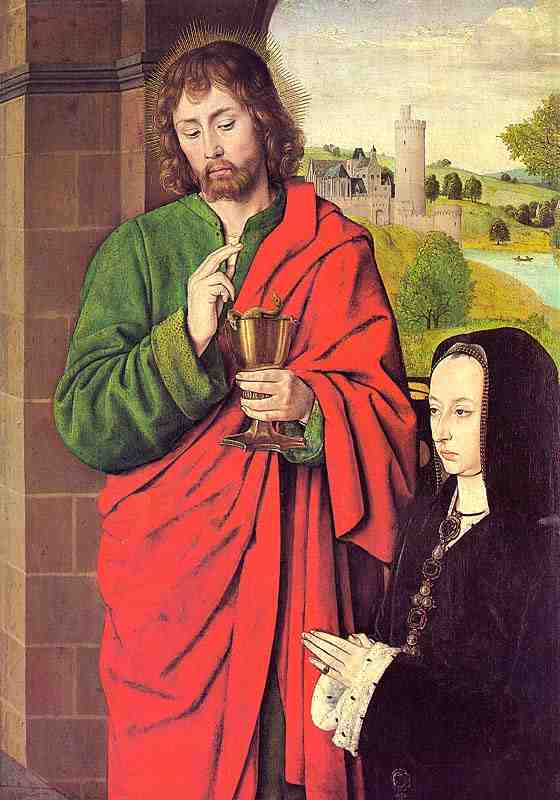
Anne of France presented by Saint John the Evangelist
As Jean Hey

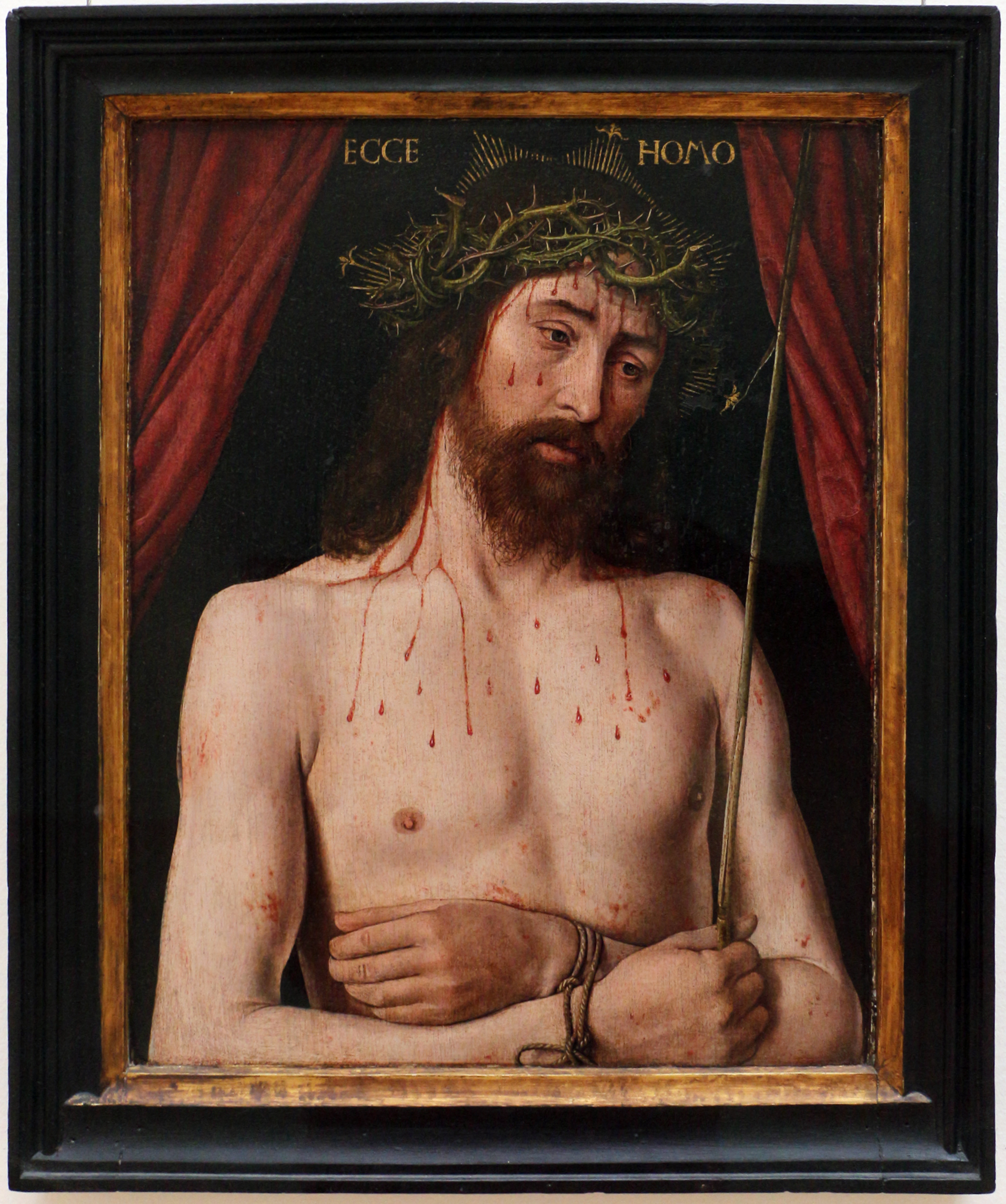
Christ with Crown of Thorns (Ecce Homo), 1494
