= Virgin of Mercy (Quarton and Vilatte) =

Painting by Enguerrand Quarton and Pierre Vilatte

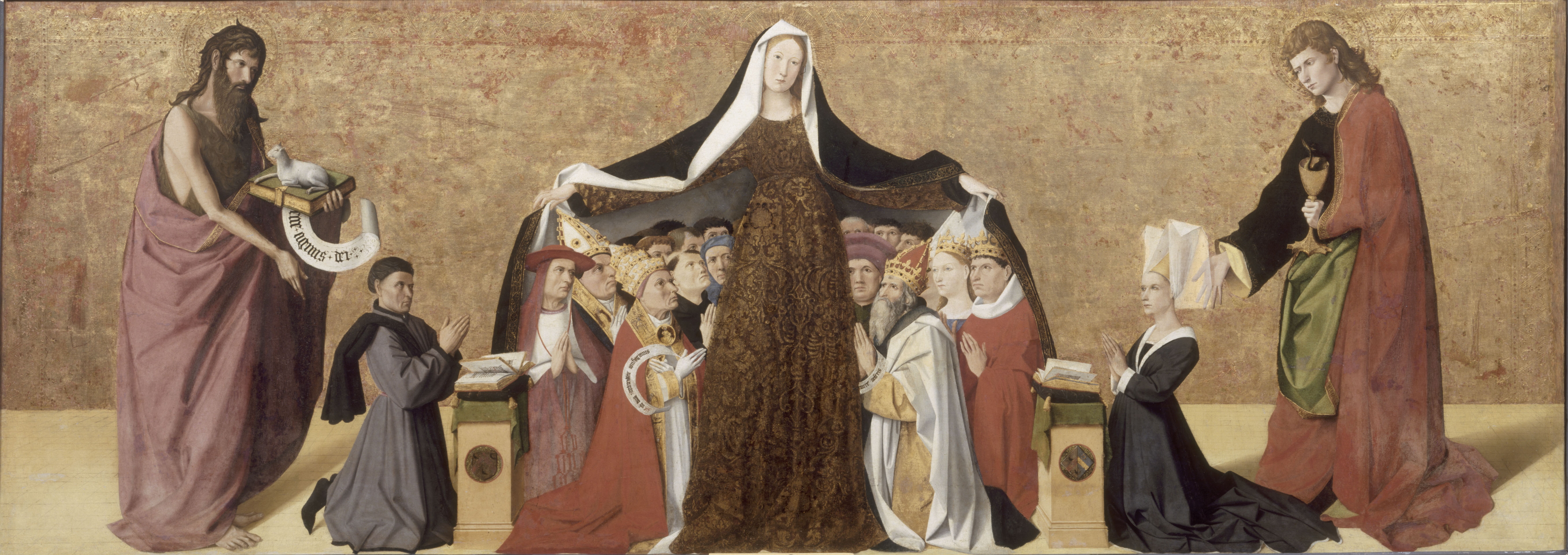
The Virgin of Mercy, with Saint John the Baptist and Saint John the Evangelist – each identifiable by their attributes – standing behind the donor portraits.

The Virgin of Mercy is a painting of the Virgin of Mercy type, produced around 1452 for the Cadard family by Enguerrand Quarton and Pierre Vilatte. It is now in the Musée Condé in Chantilly.

== History and description ==
It was commissioned on 16 February 1452 by the procureurs of the Augustinian monastery for Pierre Cadard, in honour of his father, the doctor Jean Cadard (1377-1449). Jean had been counsellor to Charles VII of France, and went into exile in the Comtat Venaissin after being accused of having John the Fearless assassinated in 1419. It was intended as the altarpiece for the chapel of Saint Pierre of Luxembourg, which Jean Cadard had had built for the Église des Célestins in Avignon.

The contract for the painting included a predella but did not specify its subject. It is now lost, but according to tradition it showed Christ surrounded by the Twelve Apostles. An upper panel is also now lost.

The next record of the work dates to 1823, when it was in the family collection of Jean-Baptiste Rousseau, French consul to Baghdad. It was then bought by the Louvre curator Frédéric Reiset, at which time it was described as a late 15th century Flemish primitive work. Along with the rest of Reiset's collection, it was bought by Henri d'Orleans, Duke of Aumale in 1879 and placed in the cabinet de Giotto in his Château de Chantilly. Archival studies in 1904 by Henri Bouchot and Paul Durrieu allowed the work to be definitively attributed to Enguerrand Quarton.
