= Enguerrand Quarton =

French painter

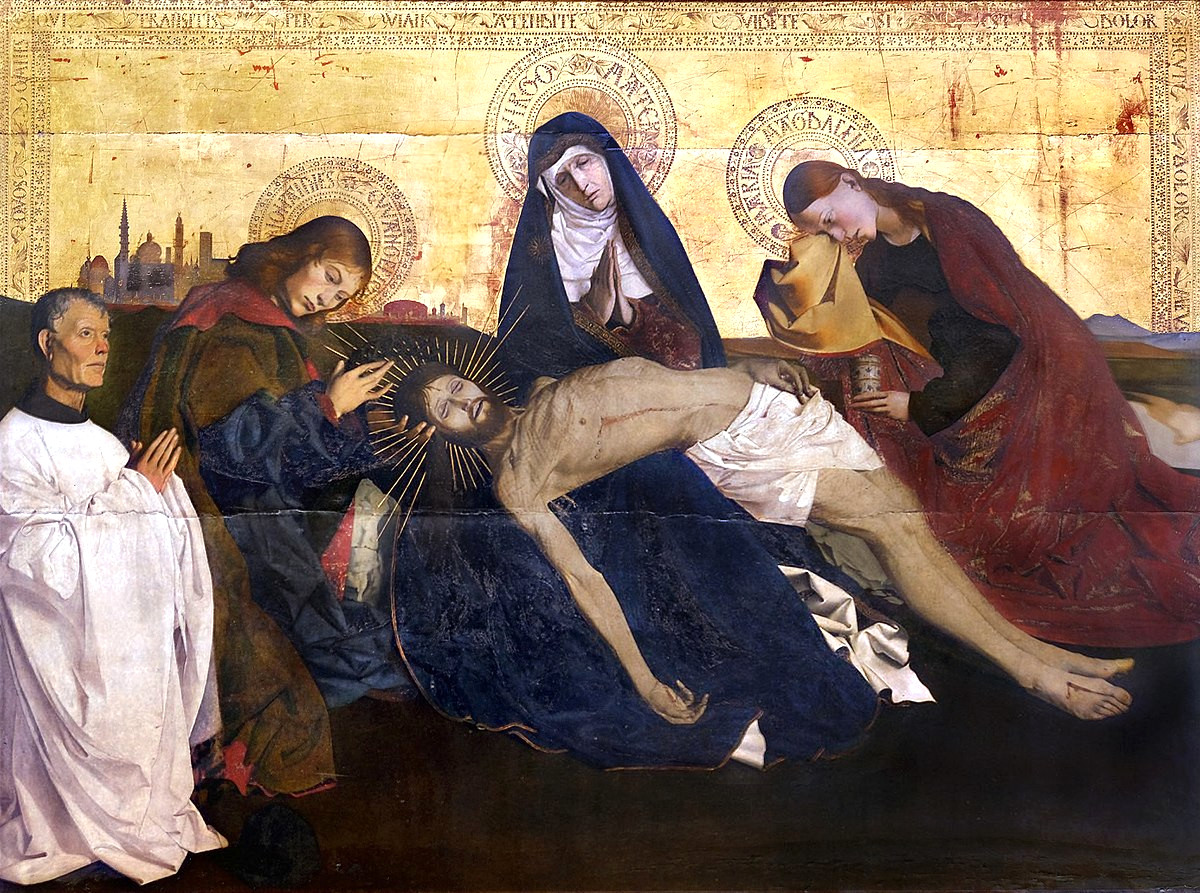
The Pietà of Villeneuve-lès-Avignon in the Louvre, c. 1455

Enguerrand Quarton (or Charonton) (c. 1410 – c. 1466) was a French painter and manuscript illuminator whose few surviving works are among the first masterpieces of a distinctively French style, very different from either Italian or Early Netherlandish painting. Six paintings by him are documented, of which only two survive, and in addition the Louvre now follows most art historians in attributing to him the famous Avignon Pietà. His two documented works are the remarkable Coronation of the Virgin (1453–54, Villeneuve-les-Avignon) and The Virgin of Mercy (1452, Musée Condé, Chantilly). Two smaller altarpieces are also attributed to him.

== Life and career ==
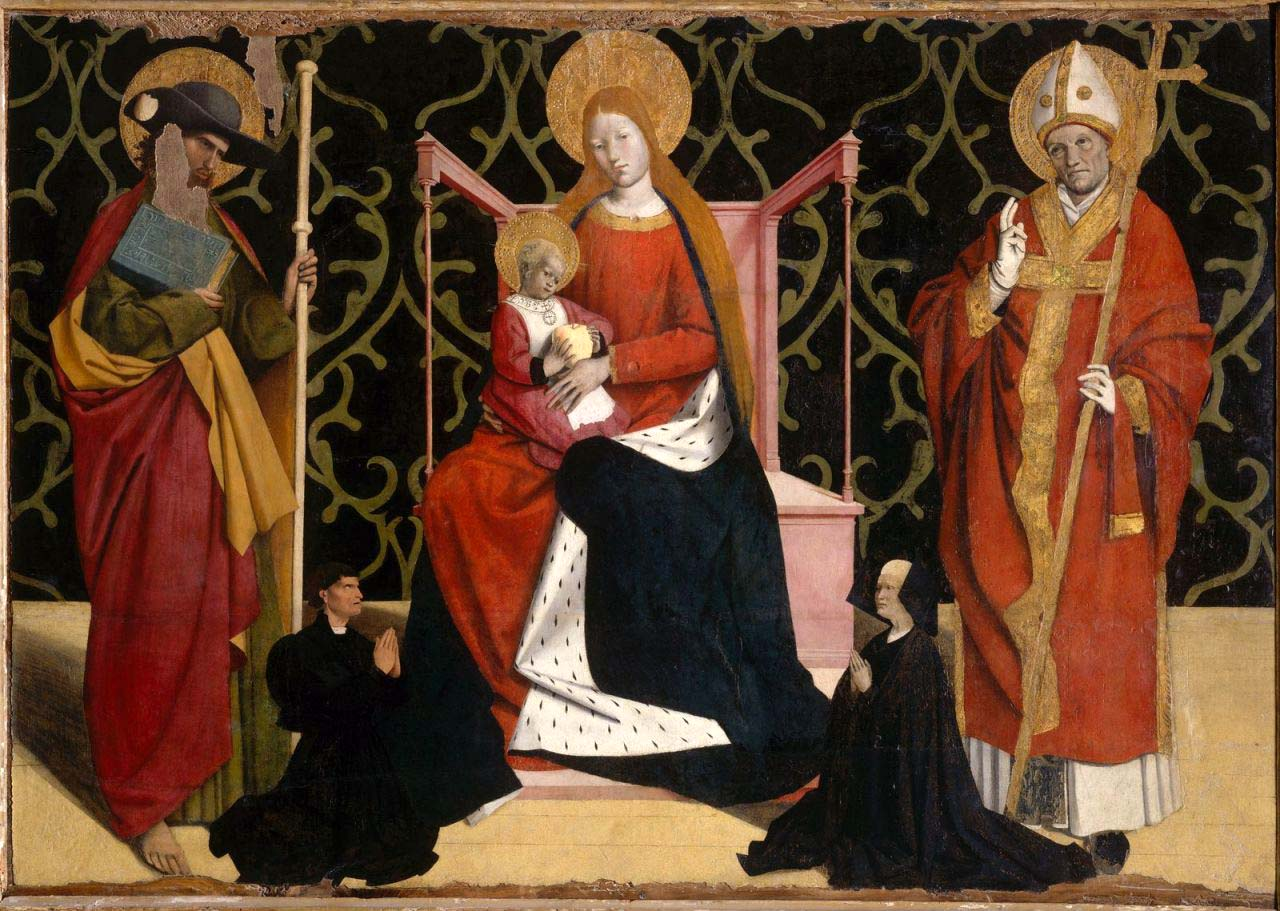
The Requin Altarpiece, Musée du Petit Palais, Avignon

Quarton was born in the diocese of Laon in northern France, but moved to Provence in 1444, possibly after working in the Netherlands. There he worked in Aix-en-Provence, Arles in 1446, and Avignon, where he was based from 1447 until his death there in about 1466. Provence at this time had some of the most impressive painters in France, to judge by surviving work at any rate, with Nicolas Froment and Barthélemy d'Eyck, who both appear to have collaborated with Quarton; the North had Jean Fouquet however. All were influenced by both Italy and the Netherlands to varying degrees. The Popes and Anti-Popes were no longer living in Avignon, but it remained Papal territory, and the city contained many Italian merchants.

Except for some banners, no works by Quarton for René of Anjou, the ruler of most of Provence, are documented, although René was a keen patron of the arts who employed D'Eyck for many years and patronised several other artists. Many of Quarton's clients were important figures in René's court and administration, like the Chancellor of Provence who commissioned the Missal of Jean des Martins (BnF, Ms nouv. aq. Latin. 2661).

Although the influence of Quarton can be seen strongly in subsequent Provençal painting, and also in some works as far away as Germany and Italy, he was later almost wholly forgotten until the Coronation of the Virgin was exhibited in Paris in 1900, since when both awareness of his importance, and the number of works attributed to him, has steadily increased. The attribution to him of the Avignon Pietà has only been generally accepted since about the 1960s.

== The Virgin of Mercy ==
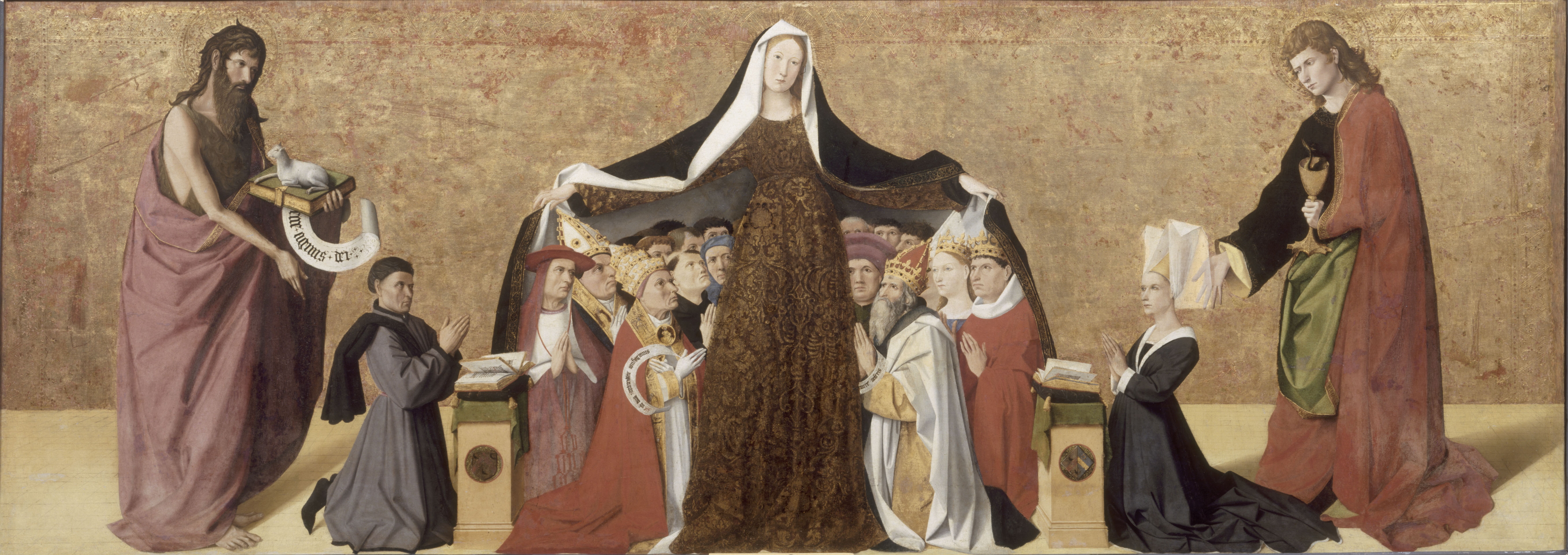
The Virgin of Mercy, 1452, Musée Condé, Chantilly, Oise

This work, also known as the Cadard Altarpiece after the donor, uses a motif that is most often found in Italian art, and was developed by Simone Martini a century earlier. The painting has the same plain gold background as the Avignon Pietà, which by this date was unusual, although it also appears in what is now the best-known version of this theme, completed just a few years earlier by Piero della Francesca. The scale of the figures is hieratic; The Virgin and Saint John the Baptist and Saint John the Evangelist tower over the donor and his wife, who are themselves slightly larger than the faithful sheltered by the Virgin's robe. The contract of February 1452 specifies that both Quarton and Pierre Villate will work on the piece, but art historians have struggled to detect two hands in the works as it exists, although Dominique Thiébaut suggests some of the sheltering figures are weaker than the rest of the work, and by Villate. One possibility is that Villate was responsible for a predella now lost.

A recently discovered document of 1466 orders some painted or stained glass for the Town Hall of Arles from a "maître Enguibran" living in Avignon. He may have had help from Pierre Villate, who is documented as fulfilling many commissions for glass, and was also a party to the contract for the Virgin of Mercy. Hardly any work certainly his survives, but it is clear he had a considerable reputation in his day. He was younger than Quarton, but already a master of the Guild in 1452.

== The Coronation of the Virgin ==
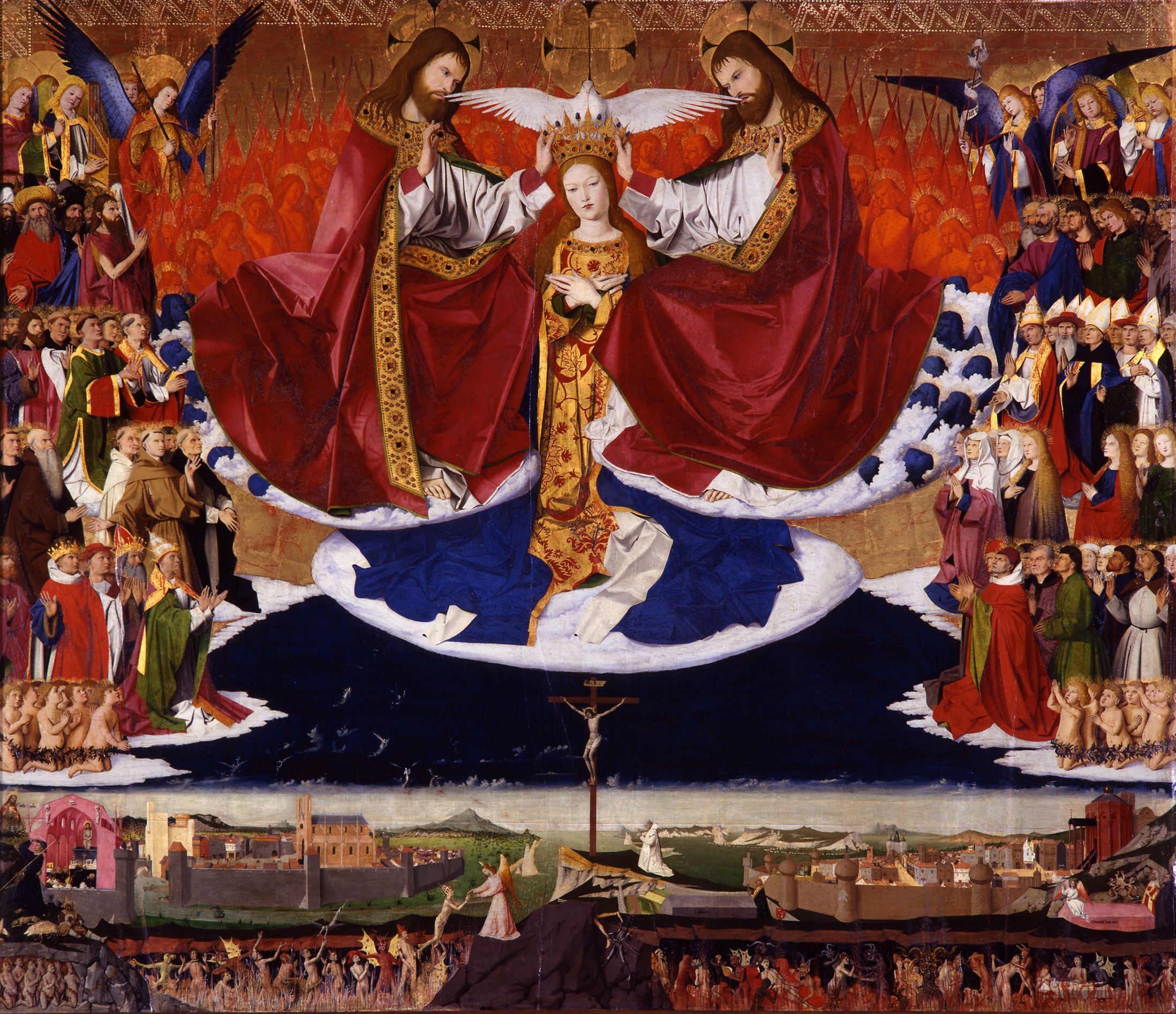
The Coronation of the Virgin, 1452-53

The Coronation of the Virgin is a common subject in art but the contract for this work specifies the unusual representation of the Father and Son of the Holy Trinity as identical figures (very rare in the 15th century, though there are other examples), but allows Quarton to represent the Virgin as he chooses. Around the Trinity, blue and red angels are deployed similar to those in Fouquet's Melun diptych (now Antwerp). The depiction of Rome (left) and Jerusalem (right) in the panoramic landscape below is also specified in the contract; the donor had been on a pilgrimage that included both cities. Beneath this Purgatory (left) and Hell (right) open up, and in the centre the donor kneels before a Crucifixion. On the extreme left a church is shown in "cut-away" style, containing a Mass of Saint Gregory. Quarton was given seventeen months from the contract date to deliver the painting by September 29, 1454. As is usual, materials were carefully specified; elements of the language used appear to come from the dialect of Quarton's native Picardy, suggesting much of the final draft was by him. The contract has been described as "the most detailed to survive for medieval European painting".

Like many of Quarton's landscape backgrounds, this depicts the Provençal landscape in a style derived from Italian painting, whilst his figures are more influenced by Netherlandish artists like Robert Campin and Jan van Eyck, but with a severity and elegance that is French alone, as is the geometrical boldness of his composition. His very strong colours have little shading, and his lighting is "harsh, even merciless". The landscape includes perhaps the first appearance in art of Mont Sainte-Victoire, later to be painted so often by Cézanne and others (some sources also mention Mont Ventoux). The painting remained for more than three centuries in the monastery Chartreuse du Val de Bénédiction, Villeneuve-lès-Avignon, for which it was commissioned by a local clergyman, Jean de Montagny. Since 1986 it is part of the collection of the Musée Pierre-de-Luxembourg in the same town.

== The Pietà of Villeneuve-lès-Avignon ==
The Pietà, where the dead Christ is supported by his grieving mother, is one of the most common themes of late-medieval religious art, and this is "perhaps the greatest masterpiece produced in France in the 15th century." The curved back form of Christ's body is highly original, and the stark, motionless dignity of the other figures is very different from Italian or Netherlandish depictions. Before the painting was generally attributed to Quarton, some art historians thought the painting might be by a Catalan or Portuguese master. The bare background landscape falls away to a horizon broken by the buildings of Jerusalem, but instead of a sky there is plain gold leaf with stamped and incised haloes, borders and inscriptions. The clerical donor, portrayed with Netherlandish realism, kneels to the left. The painting came from Villeneuve-lès-Avignon, just across the Rhône from Avignon, and is sometimes known as the "Villeneuve Pietà".

== Other attributions ==
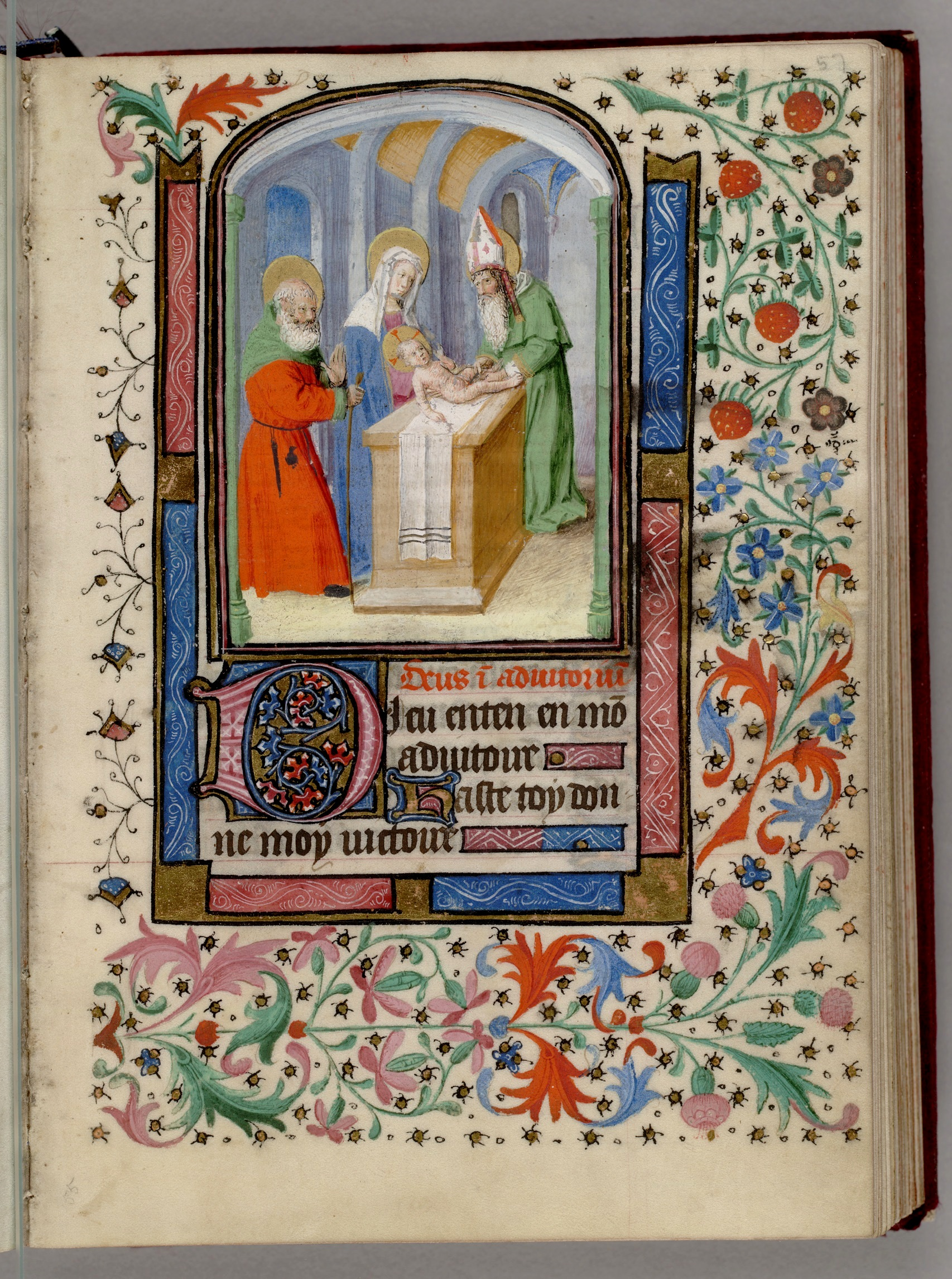
Circumcision of Jesus, Huntington Library

Some other attributions have been proposed by Luc Ta-Van-Thinh (2002):

- "Pierre de Luxembourg seeing the Christ crucified", painting on wood (musée du Petit Palais d'Avignon)
- "Saint Siffrein", painting on wood (musée du Petit Palais d'Avignon)
- "The Coronation of the Virgin, between Saint Siffrein and Saint Michael", triptych on wood (old cathedral of Saint-Siffrein of Carpentras)
- "Saint Siffrein between saint Michael and saint Catherine of Alexandria", glass in the old cathedral of Saint-Siffrein of Carpentras

== Illuminated manuscripts ==
A number of miniatures in illuminated manuscripts have been ascribed to Quarton, whose style has many distinctive features, in colouring, modelling and iconography. François Avril of the BnF has been a significant figure in these attributions, the first of which was made in 1977. In 1444 a document relating to Quarton was witnessed by him and Barthélemy d'Eyck in Aix, and from around this period dates an unfinished Book of Hours in the Morgan Library, on which they worked closely together, with some miniatures apparently drawn by d'Eyck and painted by Quarton, who also did others all by himself.

Another Book of Hours, in the Huntington Library is rather later, but variable in quality. A large and sumptuous missal in the BnF, dated 1466, with two full-page miniatures, three smaller, and many historiated initials, shows Quarton's fully developed style, as do two large miniatures added to the famous earlier Boucicaut Book of Hours by Quarton, probably in the 1460s. Some miniatures of quality from a further Hours in Namur complete those currently attributed to him.
