= Pietà =

Artistic subject of the Virgin Mary cradling the dead body of Jesus

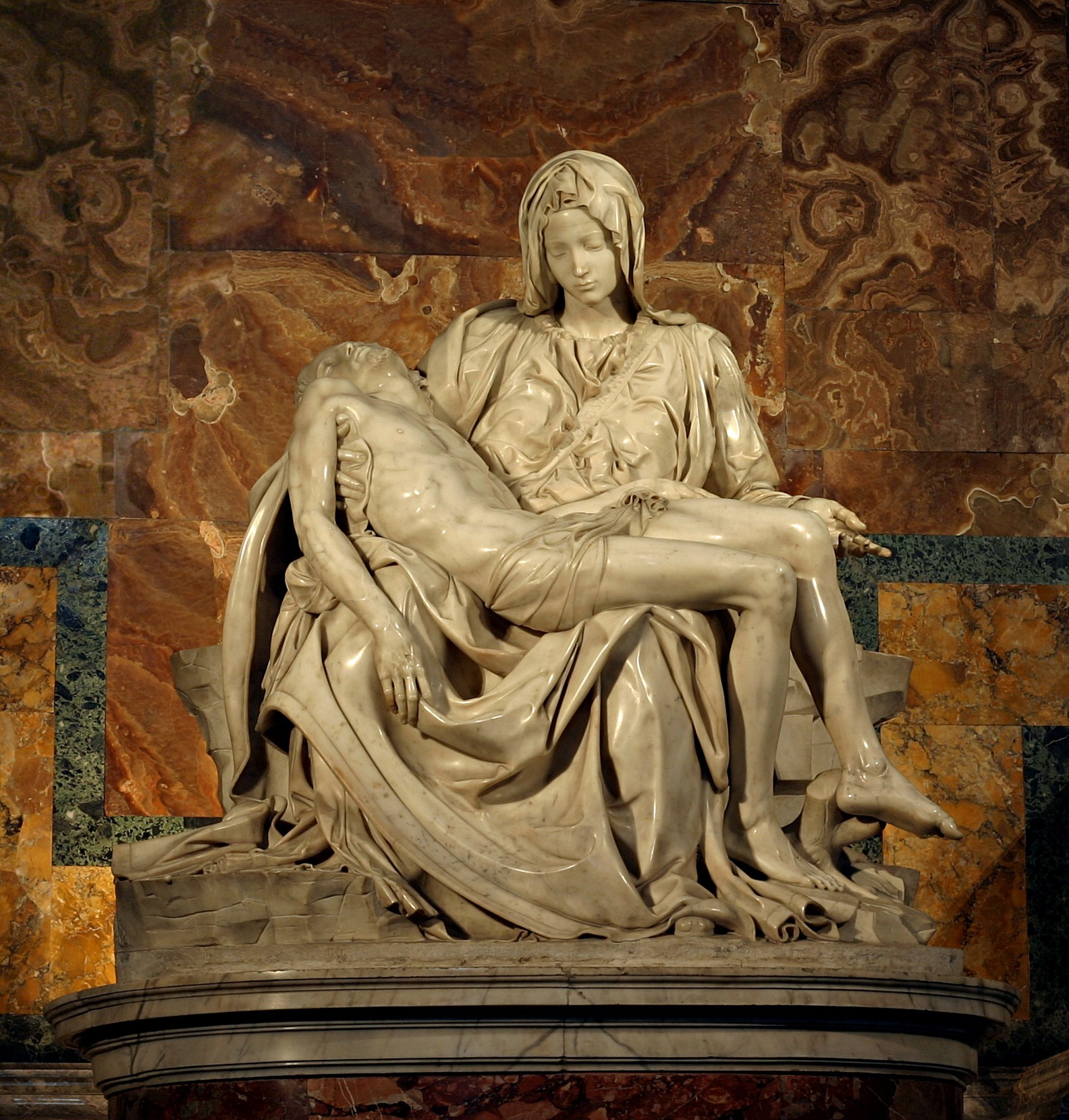
Michelangelo Buonarotti's Pietà in Saint Peter's Basilica, 1498–1499. Crowned by the Pontifical decree of Pope Urban VIII in 1637.

The Pietà (Italian pronunciation: [pjeˈta]; meaning "pity", "compassion") is a subject in Christian art depicting the Blessed Virgin Mary cradling the mortal body of Jesus Christ after his Descent from the Cross. It is most often found in sculpture. The Pietà is a specific form of the Lamentation of Christ in which Jesus is mourned by the Virgin Mary alone. However, in practice works called a Pietà may include angels, the other figures usual in Lamentations, and even donor portraits.

An image consisting only of a dead Christ with angels is also called a Pietà, at least in German, where Engelpietà (literally "Angel Pietà") is the term for what is usually called Dead Christ supported by angels in English.

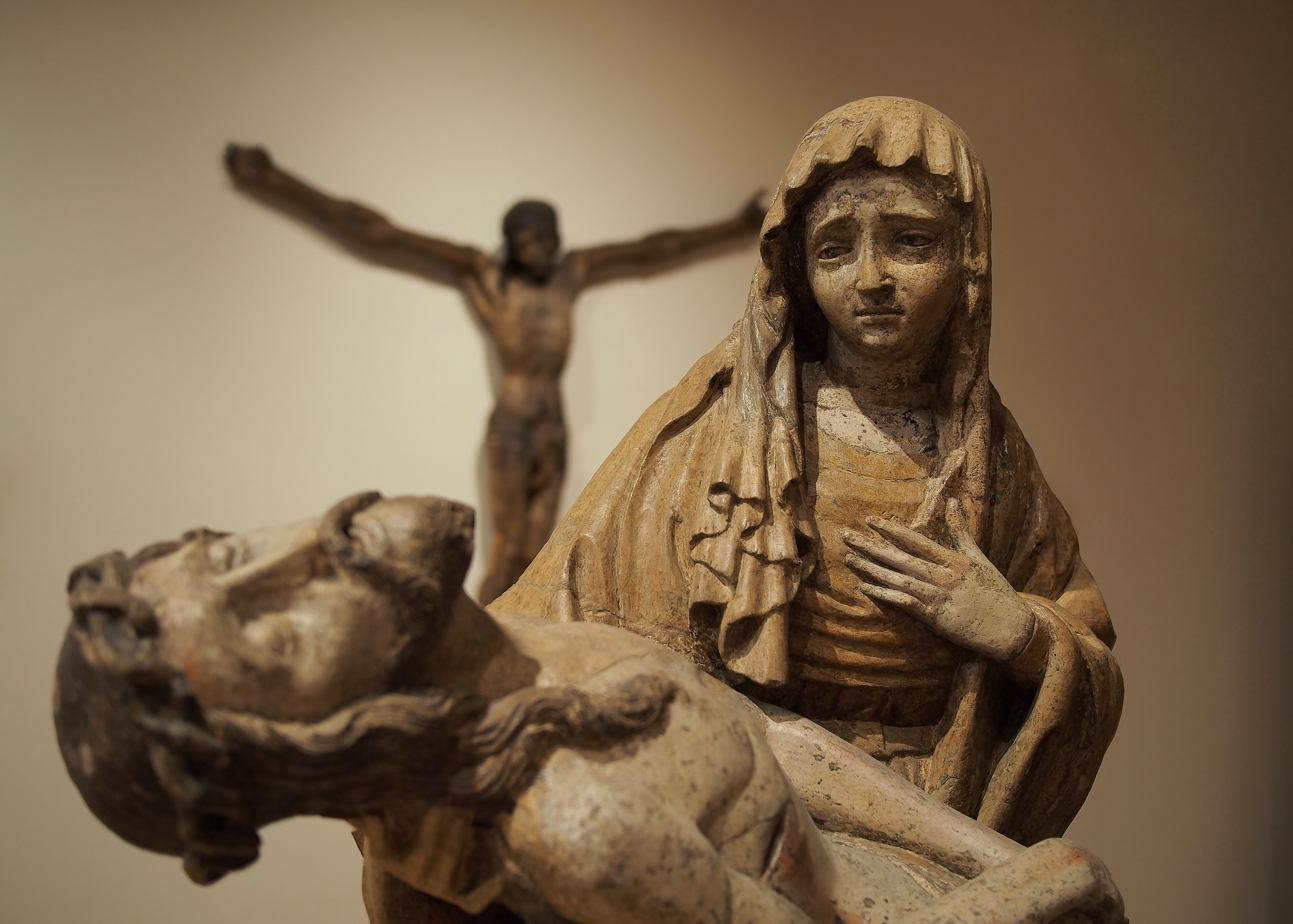
Sculpture Crucifixion of Jesus observing Virgin Mary cradling the dead body of Jesus (Salzburg work, 1470s), National Gallery of Slovenia.

Several pietàs were canonically crowned, among them the Pieta of Saint Peter's Basilica in Rome, in the Marienthal Basilica in France, the Franciscan church in Leuven, Belgium, at the Kamp-Bornhofen, Germany, and Our Lady of Charity in Cartagena, Spain.

== Context and development ==
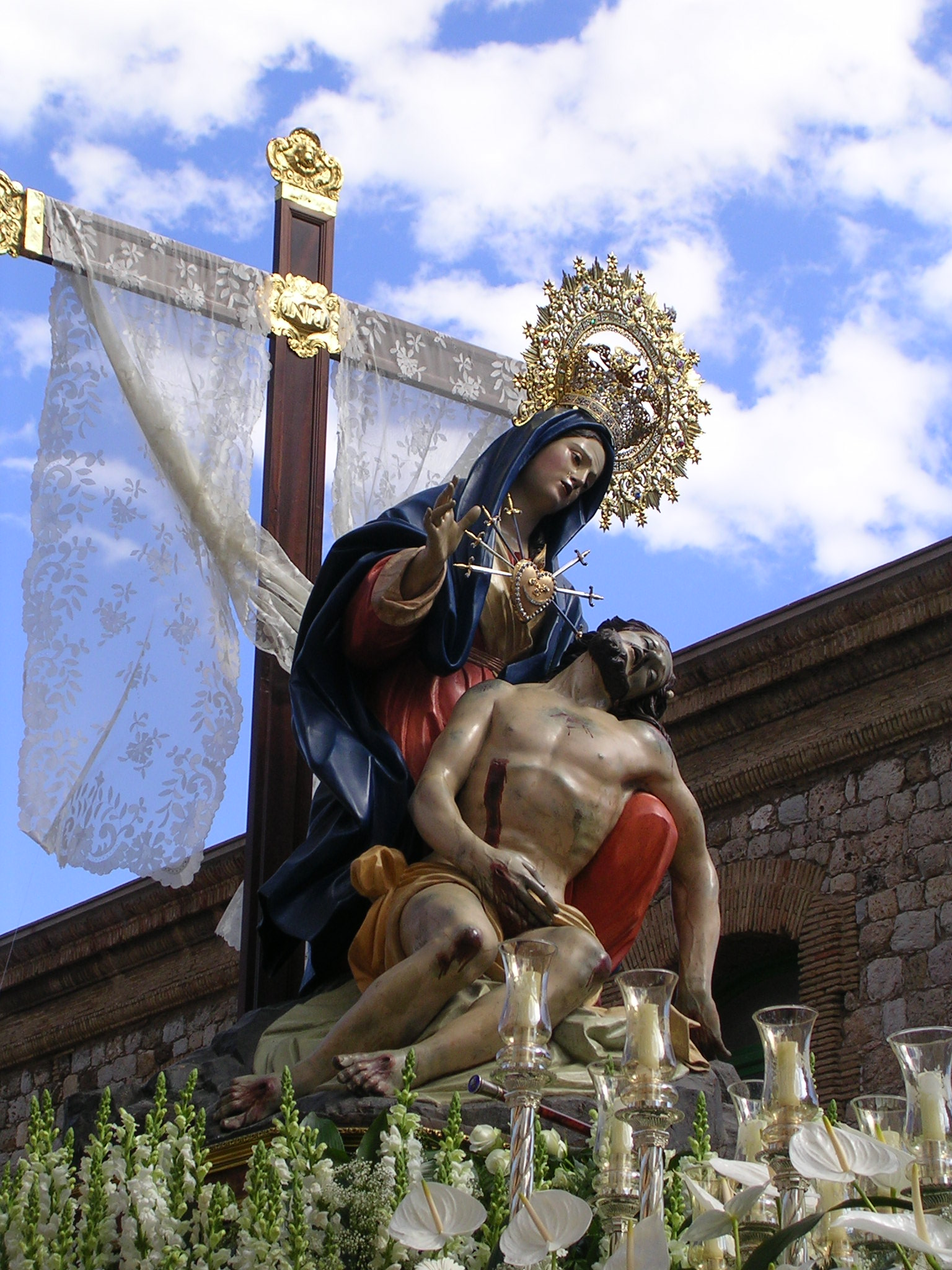
The Pieta as “Our Lady of Charity” (1723) from Cartagena, Spain. Crowned by the Pontifical decree of Pope Pius X in 1923.

The Pietà is one of the three common artistic representations of a sorrowful Virgin Mary, the other two being the Mater Dolorosa ("dolorous mother") and the Stabat Mater ("standing mother"). The other two representations are most commonly found in paintings, rather than sculpture, although combined forms exist.

The Pietà developed in Germany (where it is called Vesperbild) about 1300, reached Italy about 1400, and was especially popular in Central European Andachtsbilder. Many German and Polish 15th-century examples in wood greatly emphasise Christ's wounds. Although the subject was known in Italy, the name may have been slower to be adopted, and the Florentine diarist Luca Landucci, after describing a painting in an entry for June 1482, added "which is called by some a Pietà".

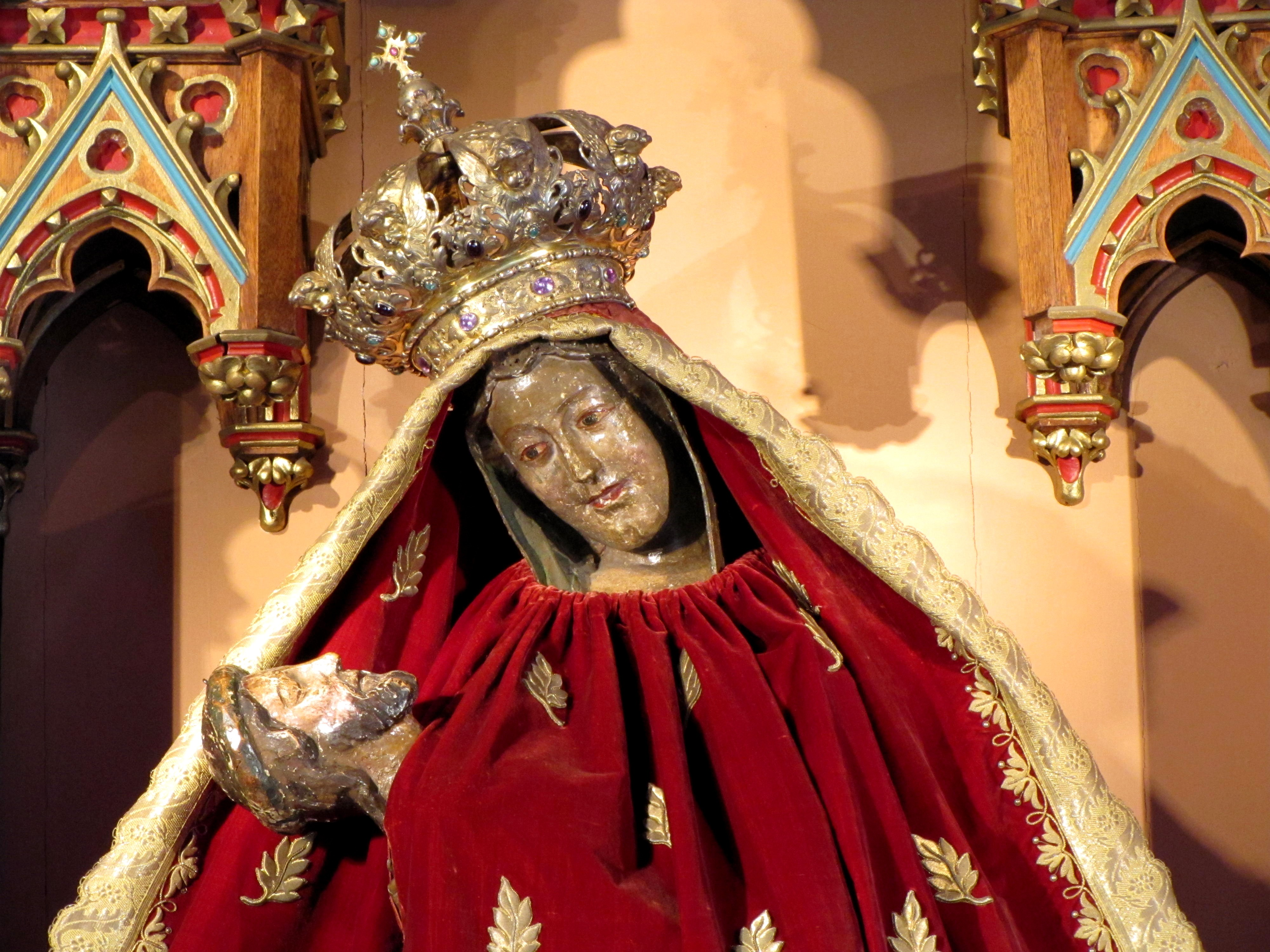
The Pietà image of the Marienthal Basílica in France. Crowned by Pontifical decree of Pope Pius IX in 1859.

The Deposition of Christ and the Lamentation or Pietà form the 13th of the Stations of the Cross, as well as one of the Seven Sorrows of the Virgin.

Although the Pietà most often shows the Virgin Mary holding Jesus, there are other compositions, including those where God the Father participates in holding Jesus Christ. In Spain the Virgin often holds up one or both hands, sometimes with Christ's body slumped to the floor.

== Michelangelo ==
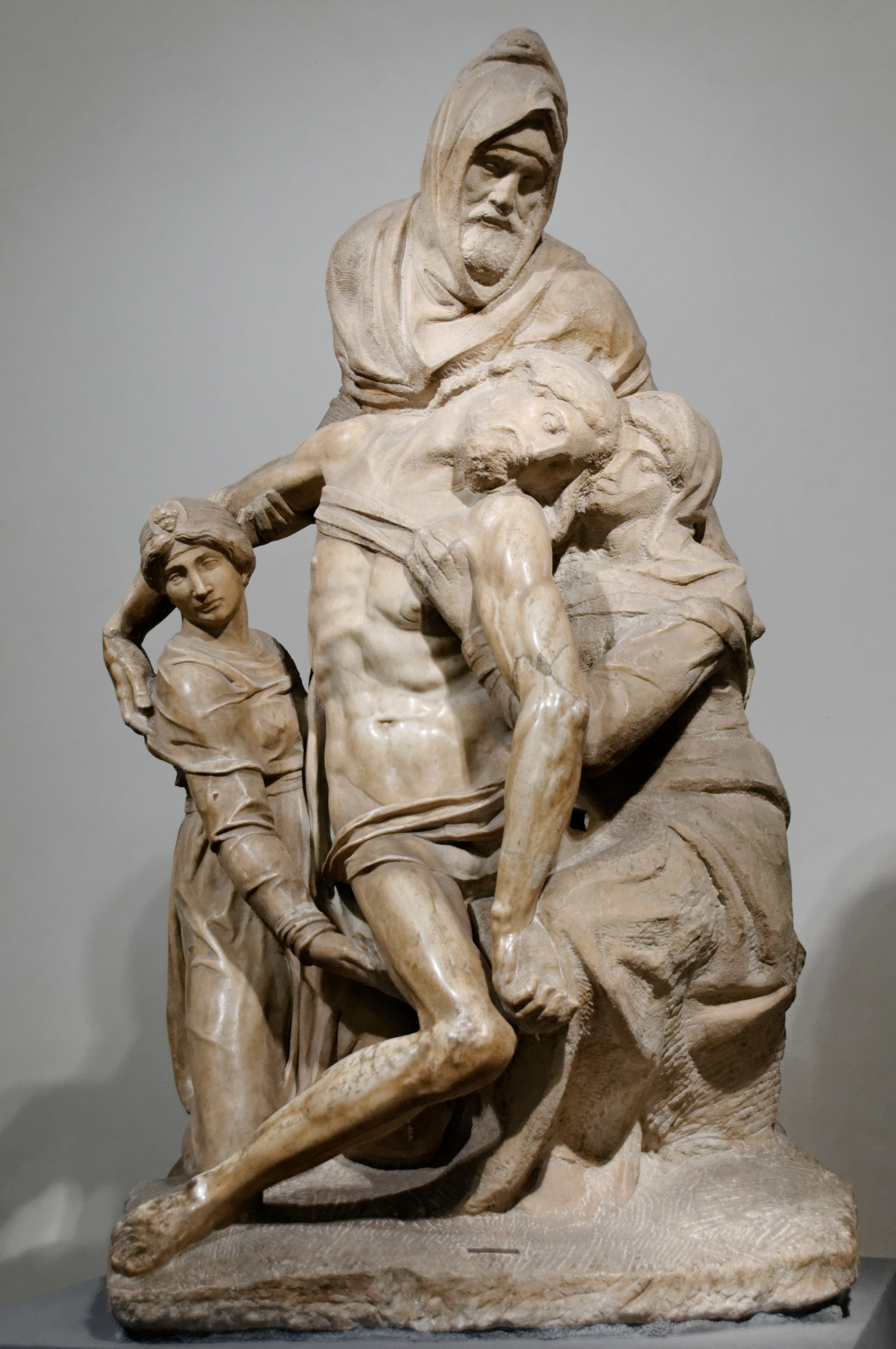
The Deposition, 1547–1555, Michelangelo, Museo dell'Opera del Duomo, Florence

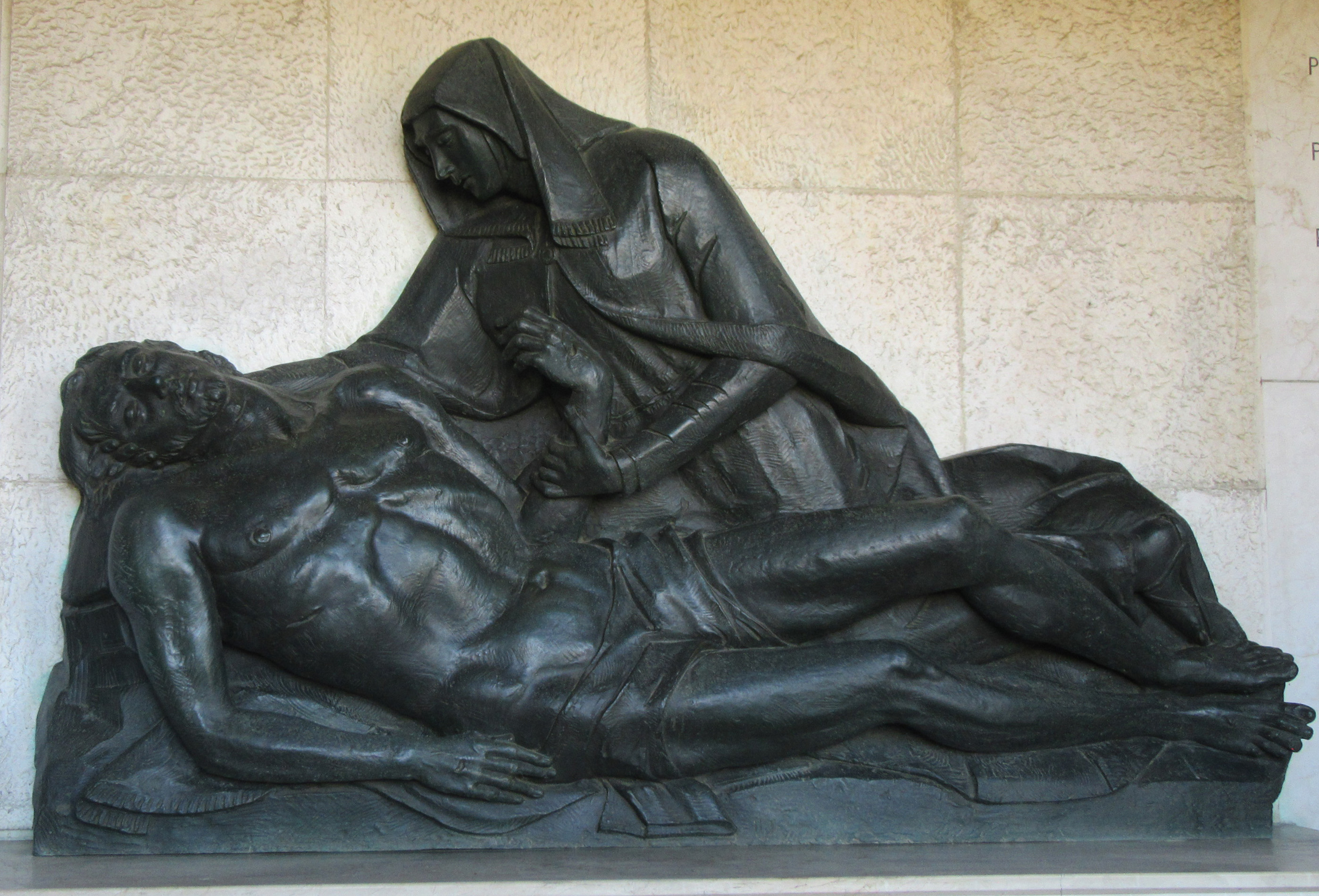
A bronze Pietà in Monumental Cemetery of Codogno, Italy

A famous example by the Italian sculptor Michelangelo in marble is in Saint Peter's Basilica in the Vatican City. The body of Christ is different from most earlier Pietà statues, which were usually smaller and in wood. The Virgin is also unusually youthful, and in repose, rather than the older, sorrowing Mary of most Pietàs. She is shown as youthful for two reasons: God is the source of all beauty and she is one of the closest to God, and because the exterior is thought as the revelation of the interior; therefore, the virgin is morally beautiful. Michelangelo's Pieta sculpture is also unique in the fact that it is the only one of his works that he ever signed. Upon hearing that visitors thought it had been sculpted by Cristoforo Solari, a competitor, he carved his signature into Mary's sash as "MICHAELA[N]GELUS BONAROTUS FLORENTIN[US] FACIEBA[T]": "Michelangelo Buonarroti the Florentine made this".

In a lesser known Michelangelo Pietà, The Deposition (c. 1547–1555), it is not the Virgin Mary who is holding Christ's body, but rather Nicodemus (or possibly Joseph of Arimathea), Mary Magdalene, and the Virgin Mary. There is some indication that the man in the hood is based on a self-portrait of the artist. The sculpture is housed in the Museo dell'Opera del Duomo in Florence and is also known as the Florentine Pietà.

A generation later, the Spanish painter Luis de Morales painted a number of highly emotional Pietàs, with examples in the Louvre and Museo del Prado.

== Dead Christ supported by angels ==
This related subject is called Engelpietà (literally "Angel Pietà") in German, and included here for that reason. It is a variant of the Man of Sorrows (Imago Pietatis) type of andachtsbilder, but showing a Christ who is clearly dead (in Man of Sorrows images he tends to have his eyes open). Typically the half-length body of the dead Christ sits on a ledge, held up by smaller angels at each side. Christ is naked down to a loin-cloth and his wounds are visible. But there are many variants of this composition, especially after about 1500. It was common in both sculpture and painting from the 14th century until the Counter Reformation, but found through the Baroque period as well.

== Comic book art and popular culture ==
The iconography of the Pietà, with a figure holding a dead body, has been regularly used in comic book art, especially on covers. One of the most famous examples is the cover for Crisis on Infinite Earths #7, which features Superman holding the dead body of Supergirl.

Lana Del Rey's 2012 music video "Born to Die" features the scene of a man holding the corpse of the singer in a Piéta-like pose.

St. Vincent's song Pietà references her father holding her in a Holiday Inn pool for her baptism "like an inverse-Piéta". This song was released on the deluxe version of the album St. Vincent.

The ending to John Steinbeck’s The Grapes of Wrath is often interpreted to symbolize a pietà, with Rose of Sharon cradling a dying old man.

Michaelangelo's Pieta is referenced in Children of Men, and towards the climax of the film the camera lingers on a woman holding her dead son in a pieta pose, itself a reference to Michaelangelo's Pieta and the "Kosovo Pieta", a noted photo of an ethnic Albanian mother mourning her son.

== Image gallery ==
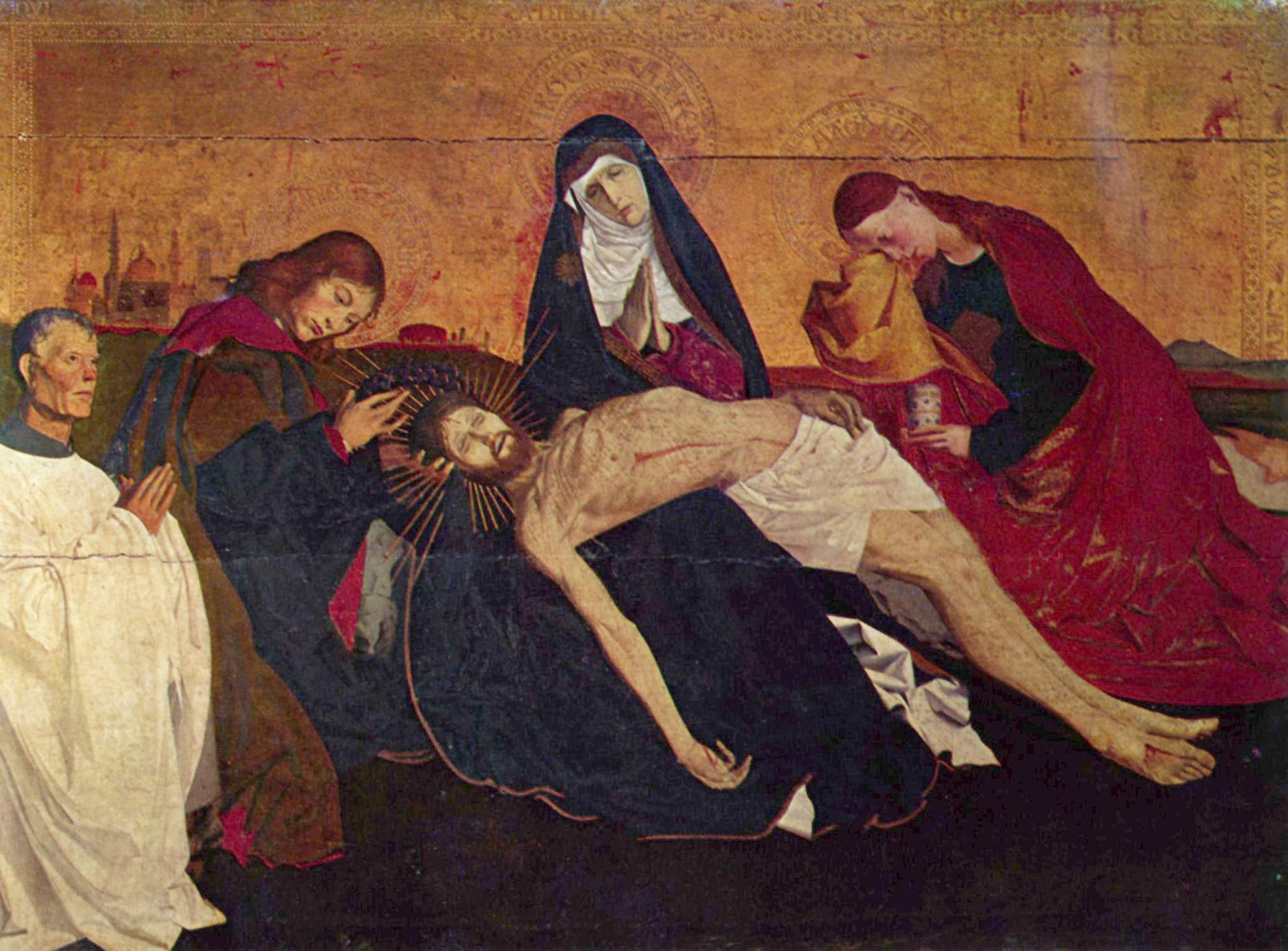
The Avignon Pietà, Enguerrand Charonton, 15th century

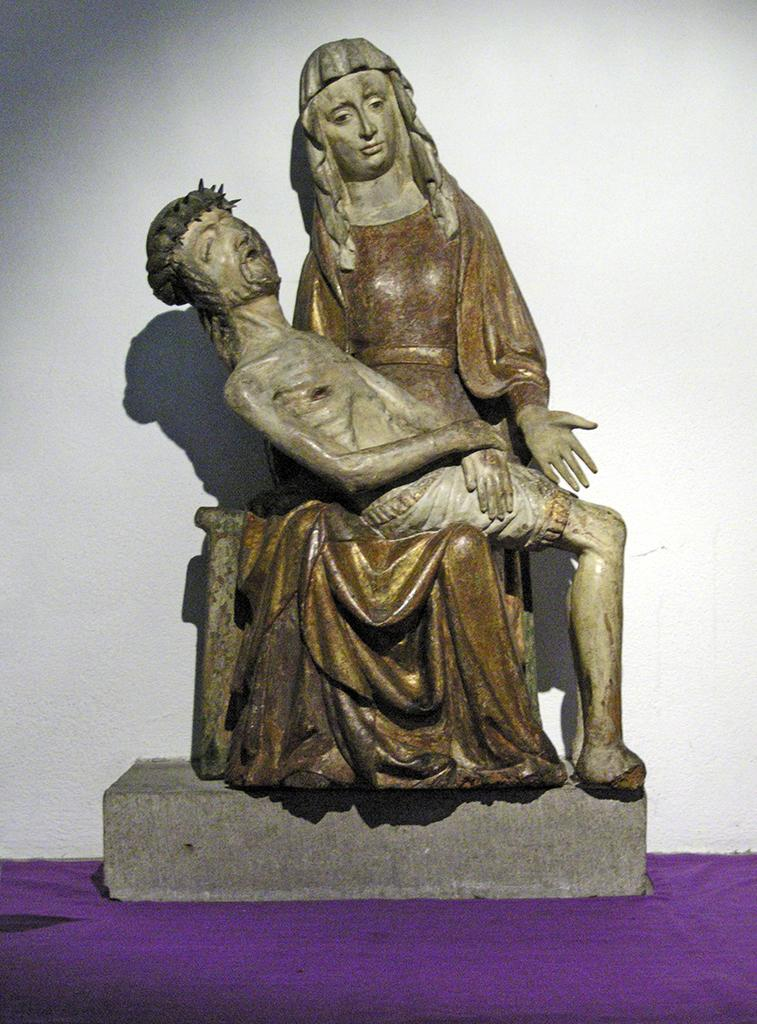
15th-century German wood Pietà from Cologne

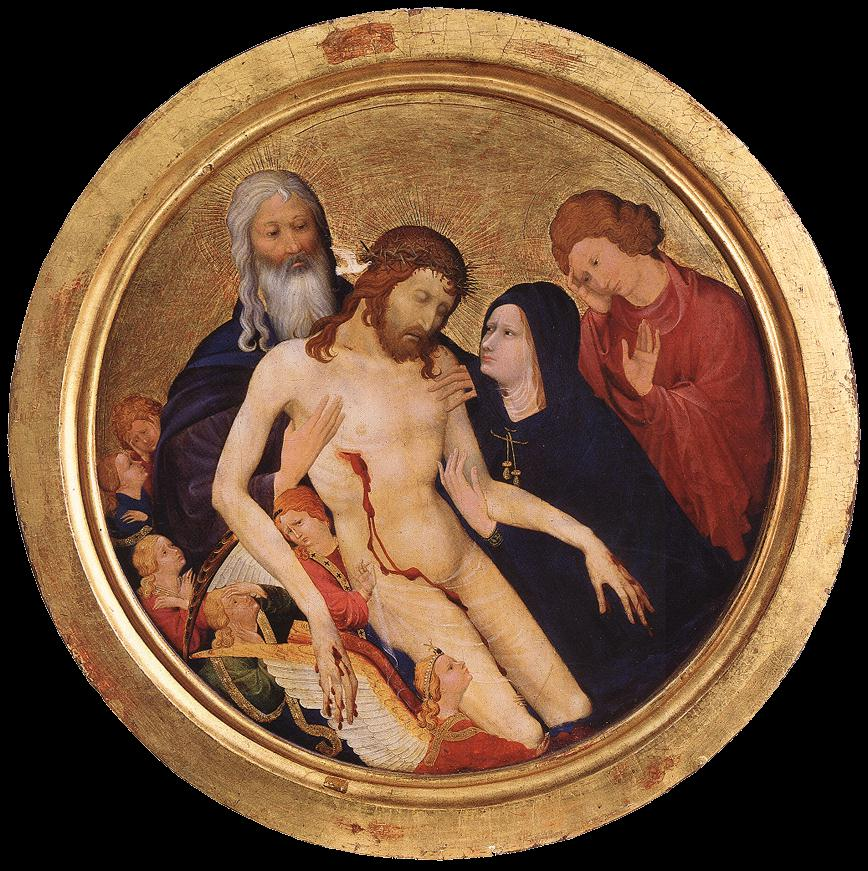
Pieta Tondo by Jean Malouel, between 1400 and 1410 (Louvre)

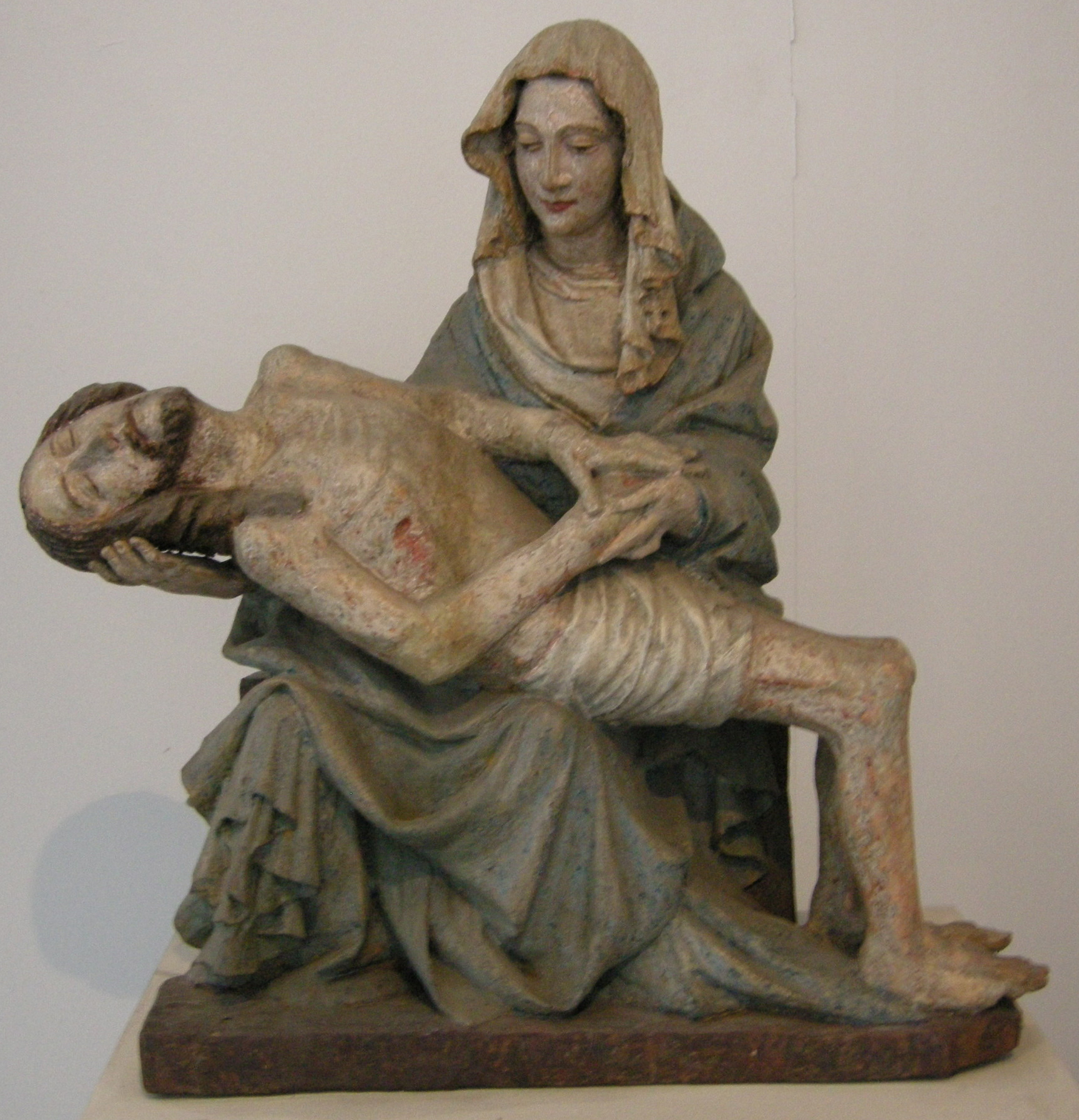
Austrian Pietà, c. 1420

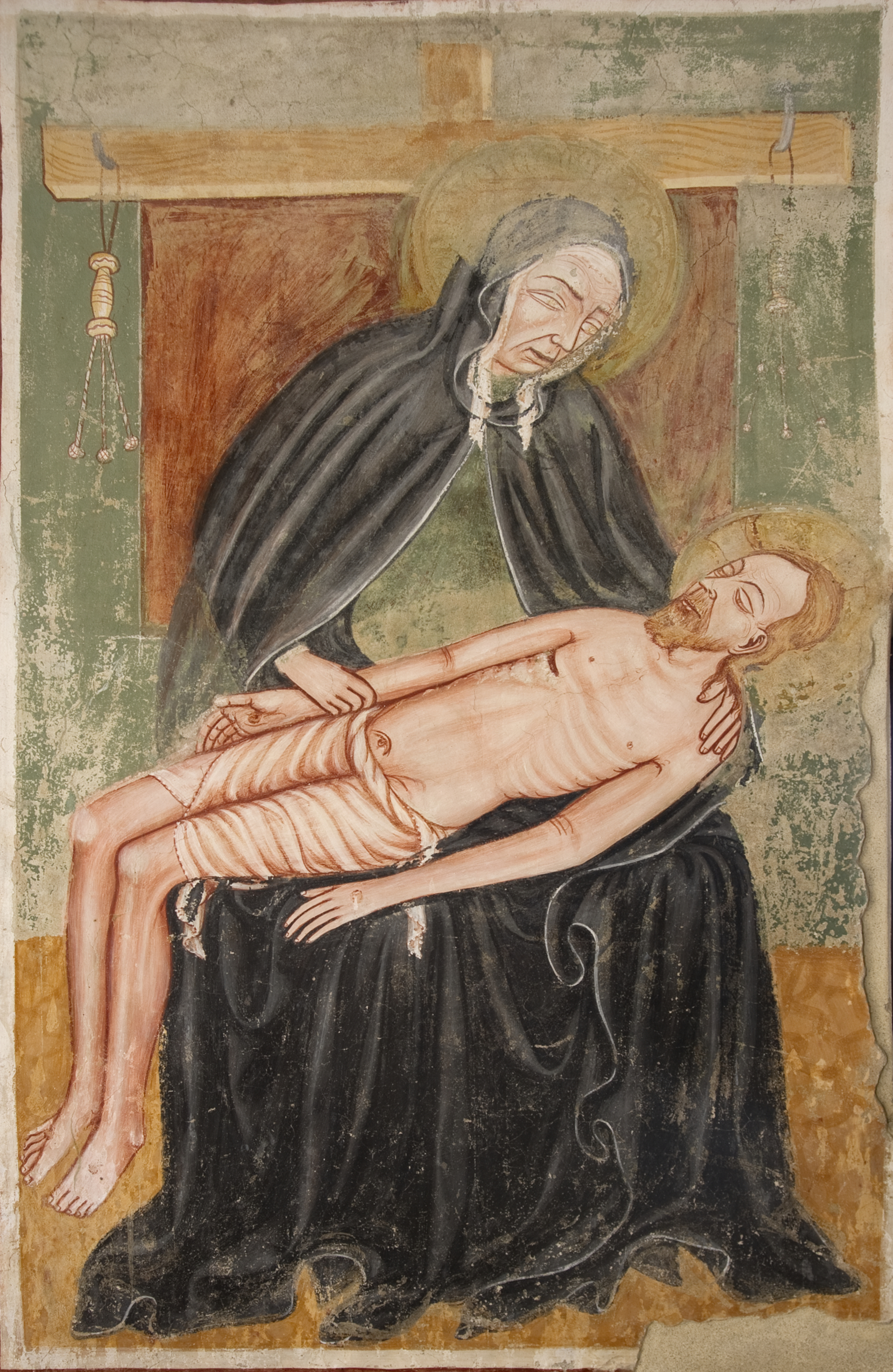
Pietà at Oratorio di Santa Maria, Garbagna Nov. (Italy), early 15th century

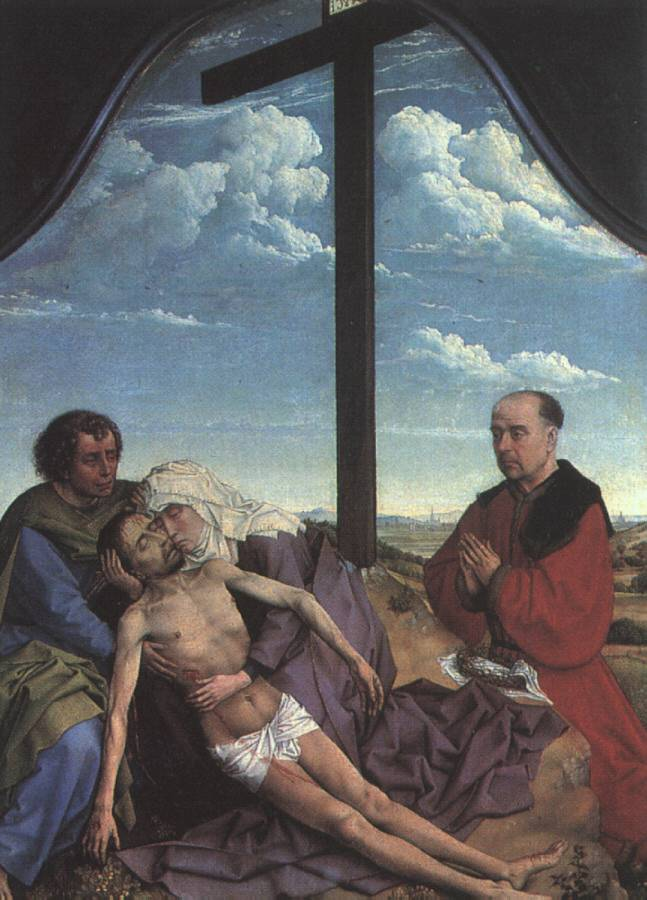
Rogier van der Weyden, Museo del Prado, Madrid, with Saint John and a donor, c. 1440-1450

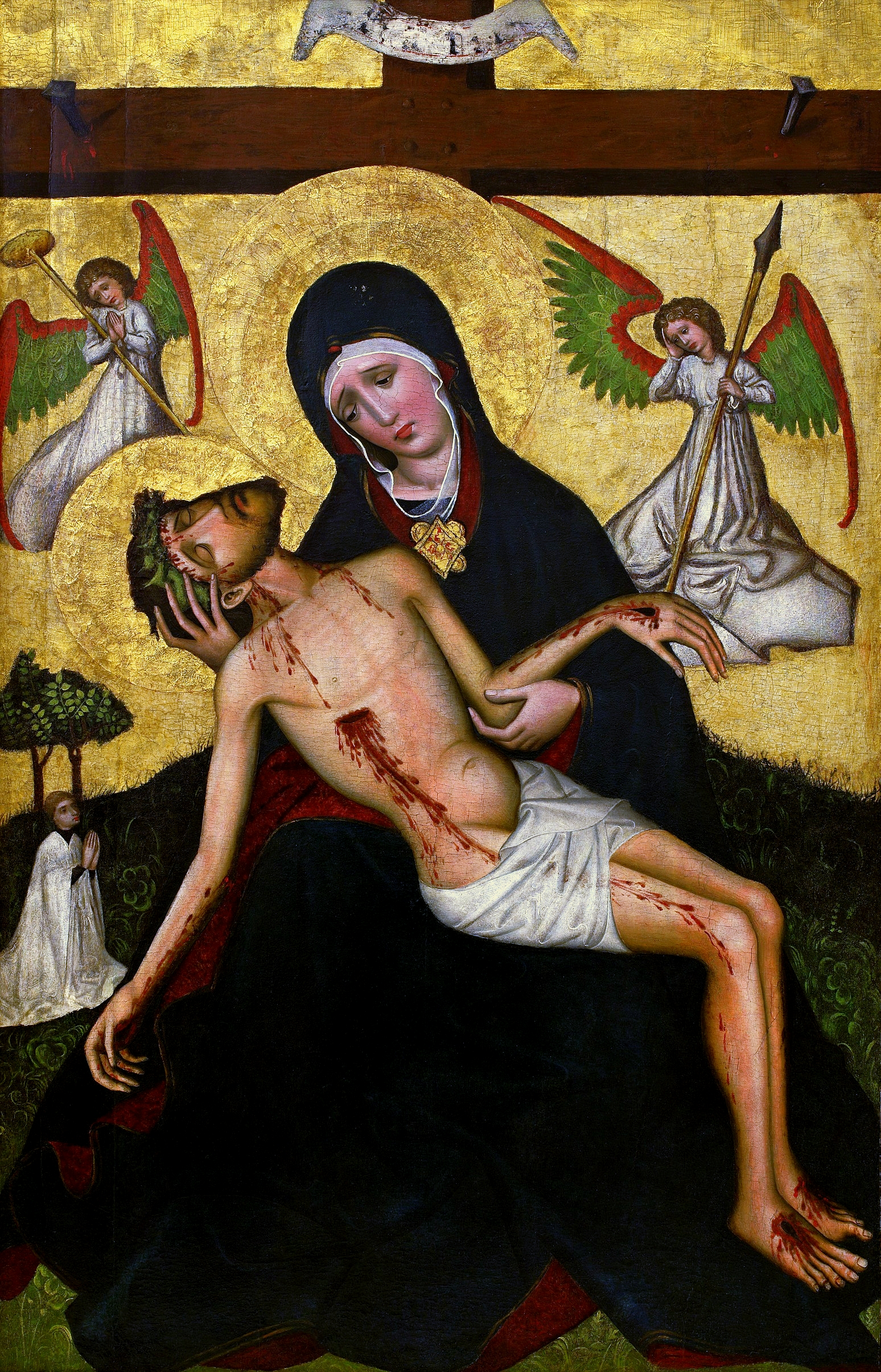
Kraków, c. 1450

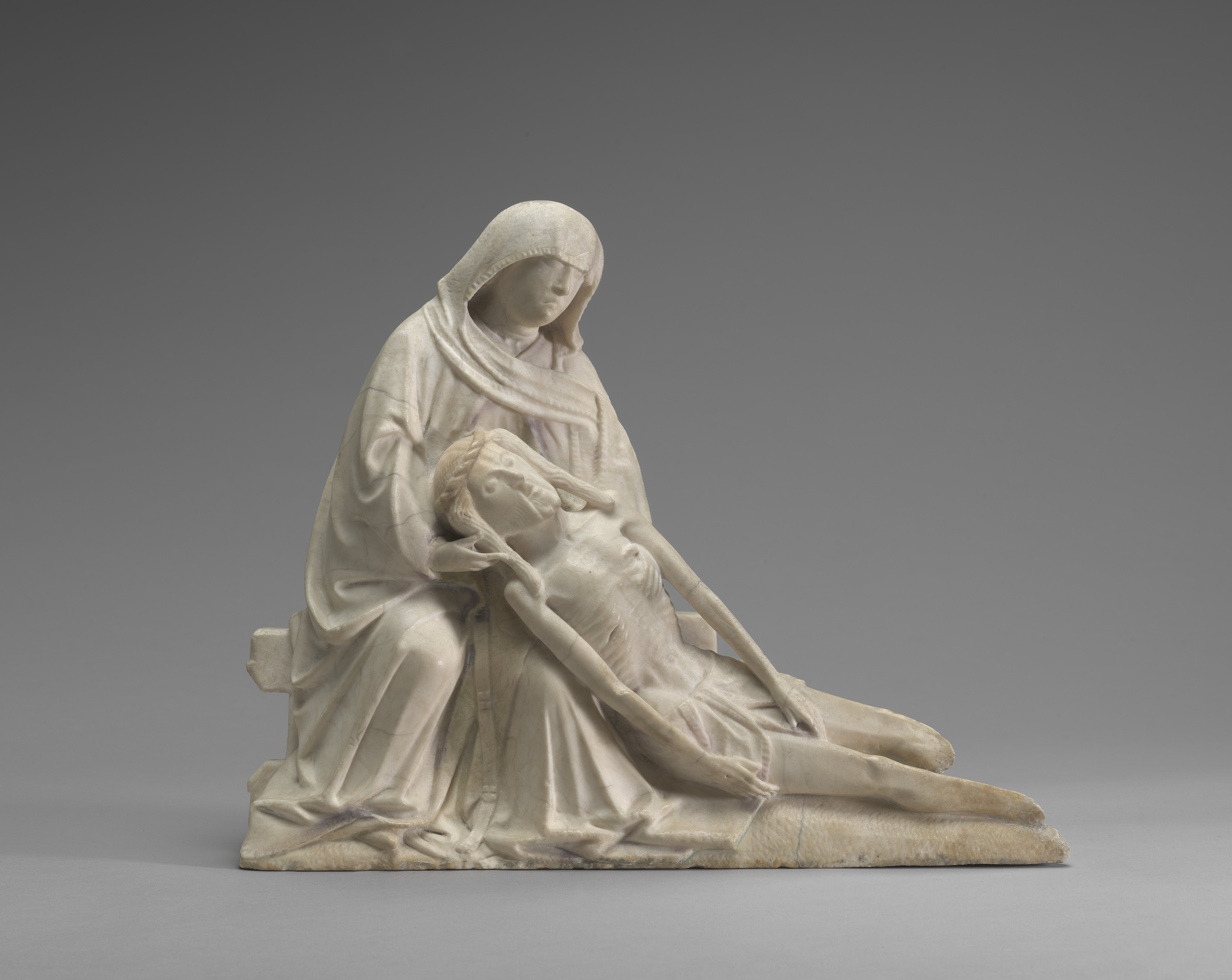
German or Netherlandish 15th Century, Pietà, c. 1450–1500, National Gallery of Art

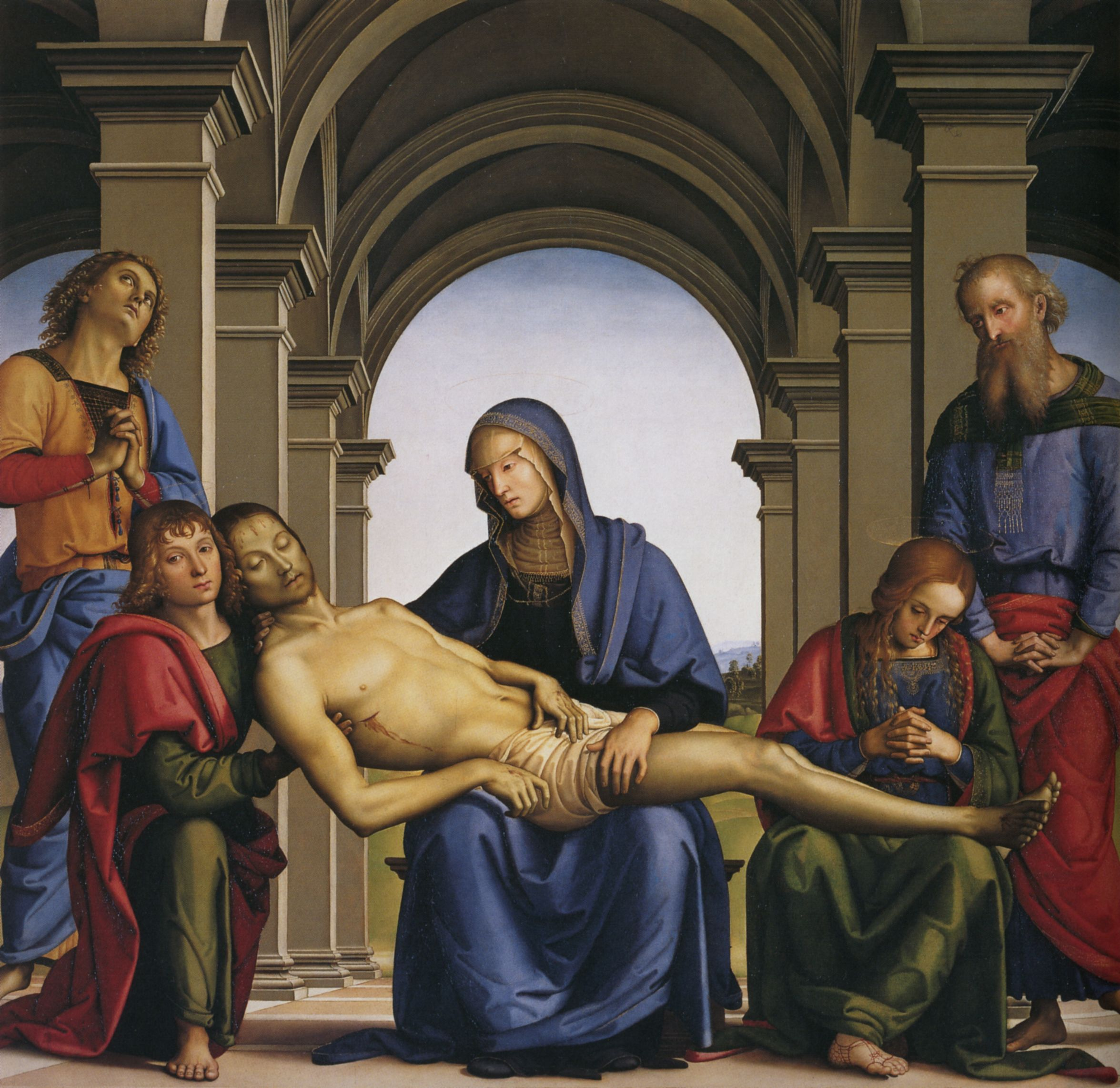
Pietro Perugino, Uffizi, 1490

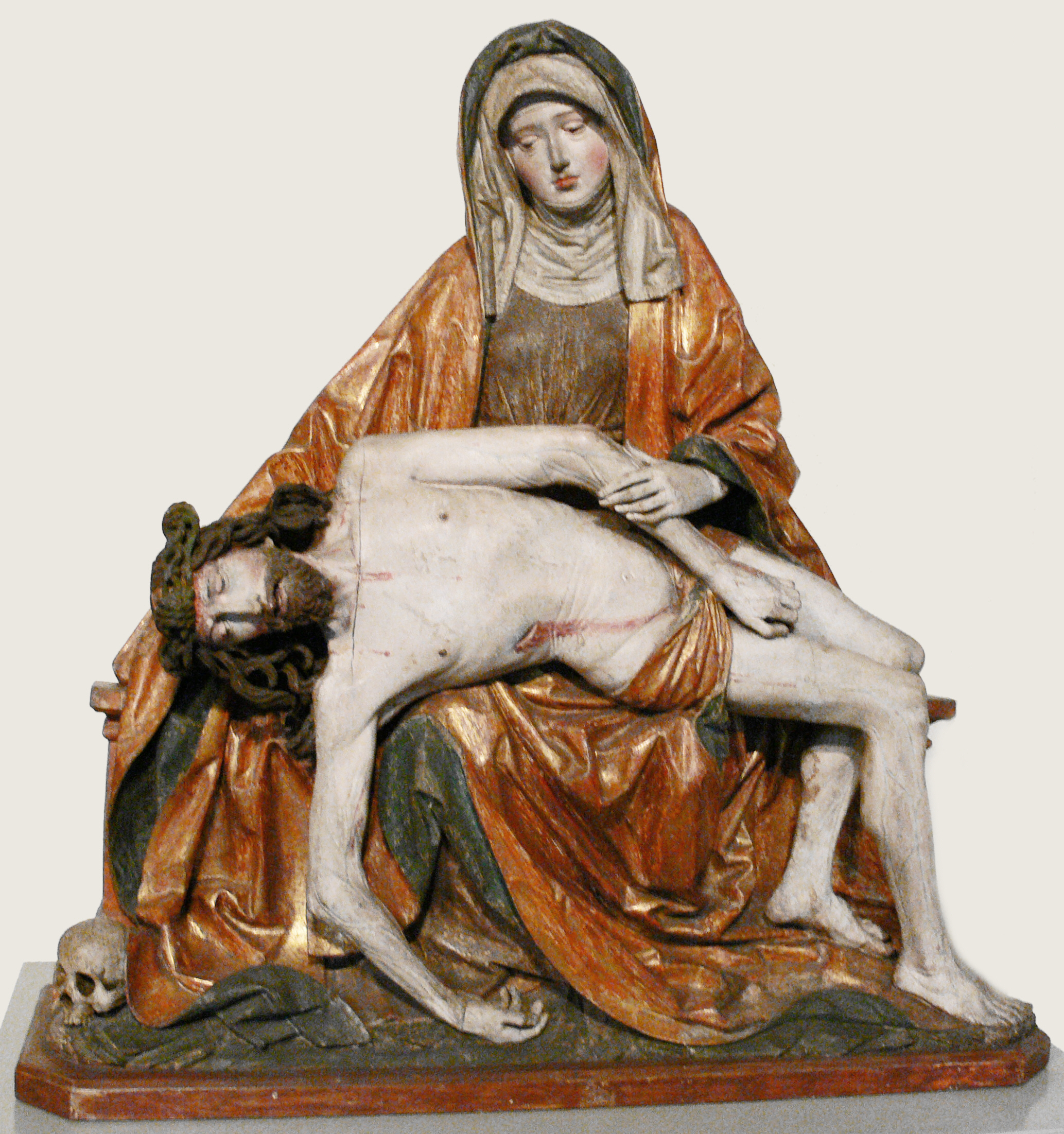
Swabian painted wood Pietà of c. 1500

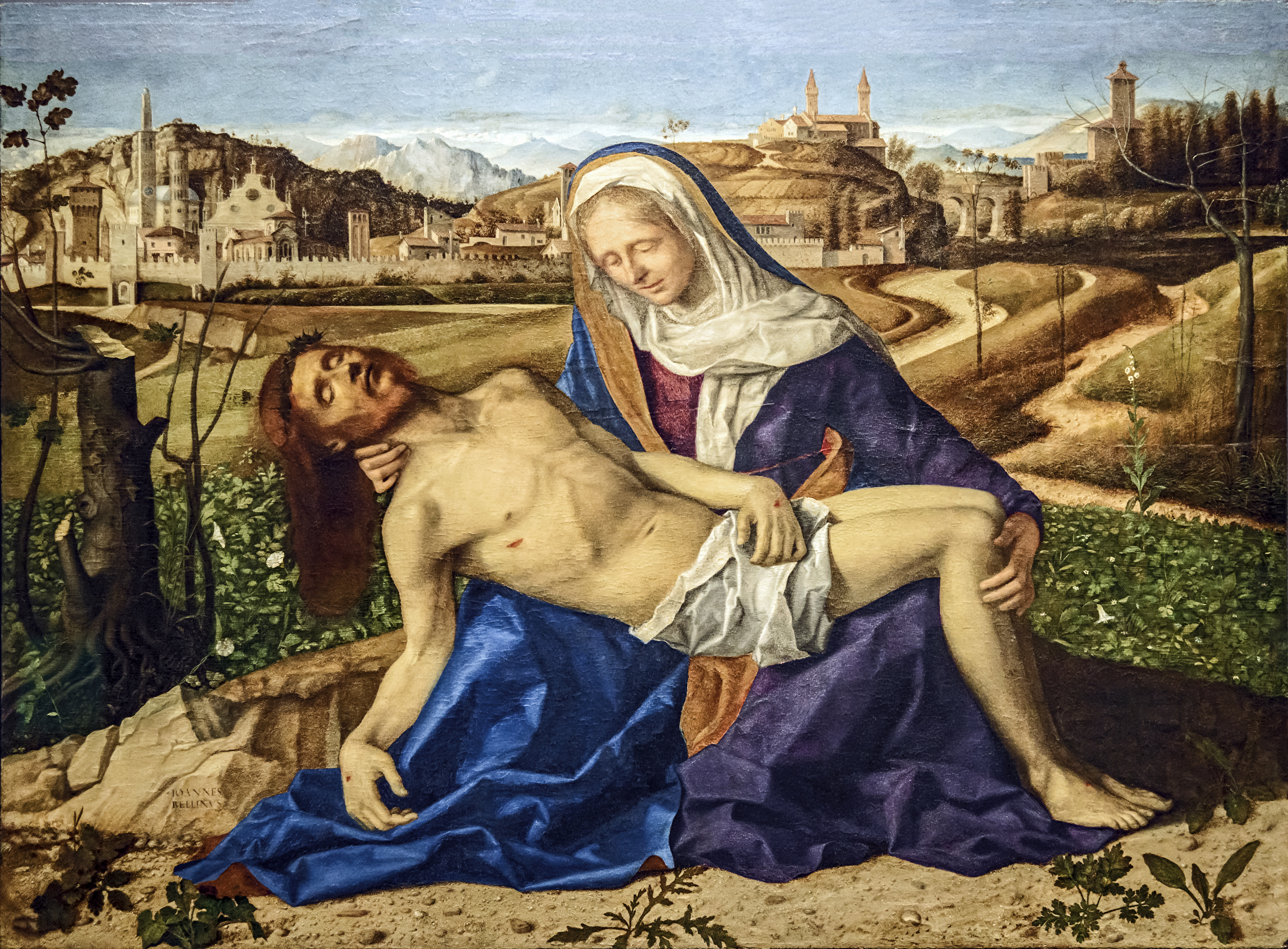
Giovanni Bellini, c. 1505

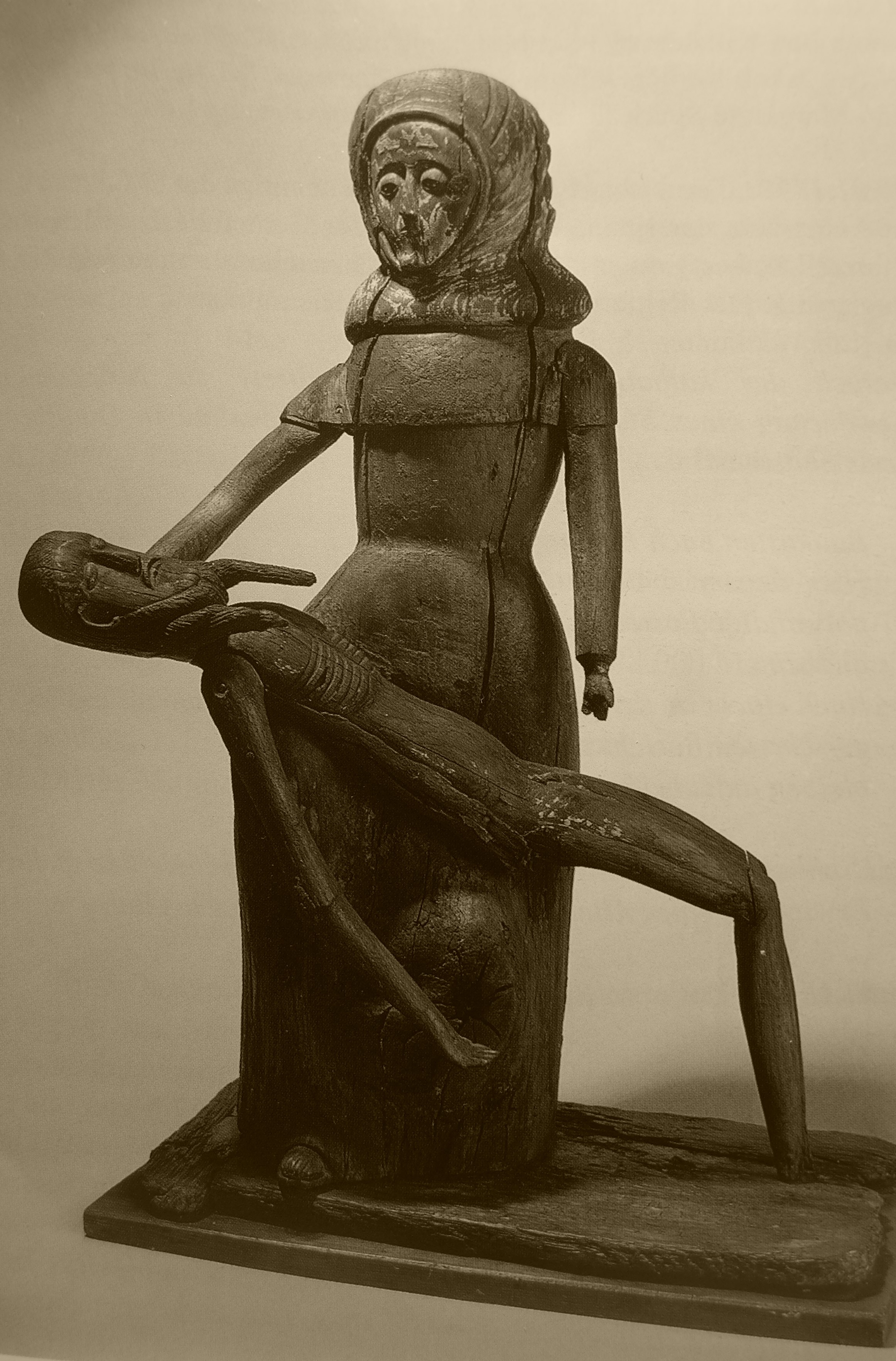
Dieffler Pietà, Wooden sculpture, presumably 15th or 18th century, former chapel of St Wendelin in Diefflen, Saarland Museum, Old Collection

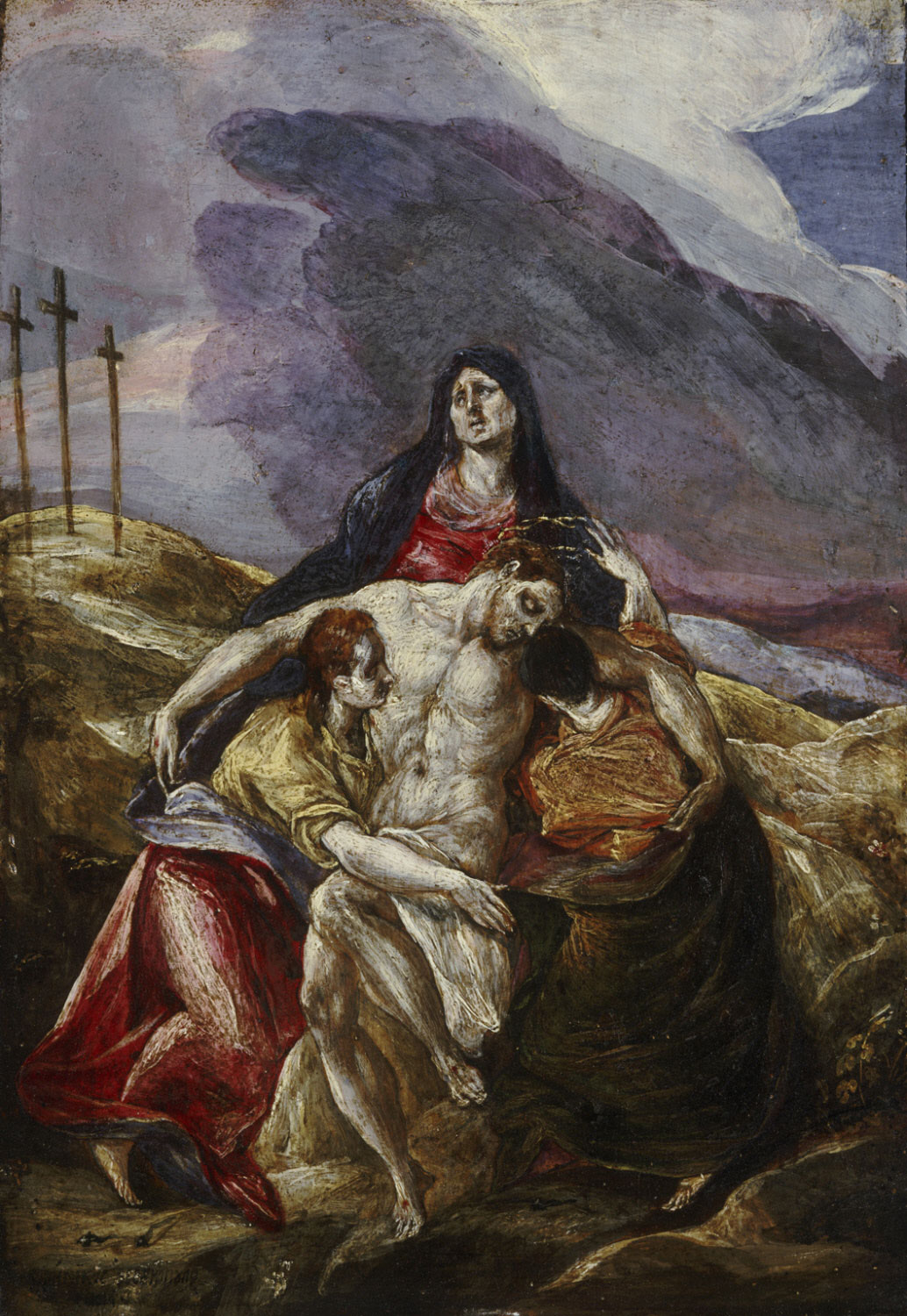
El Greco, Pietà, 1571–1576, Philadelphia Museum of Art

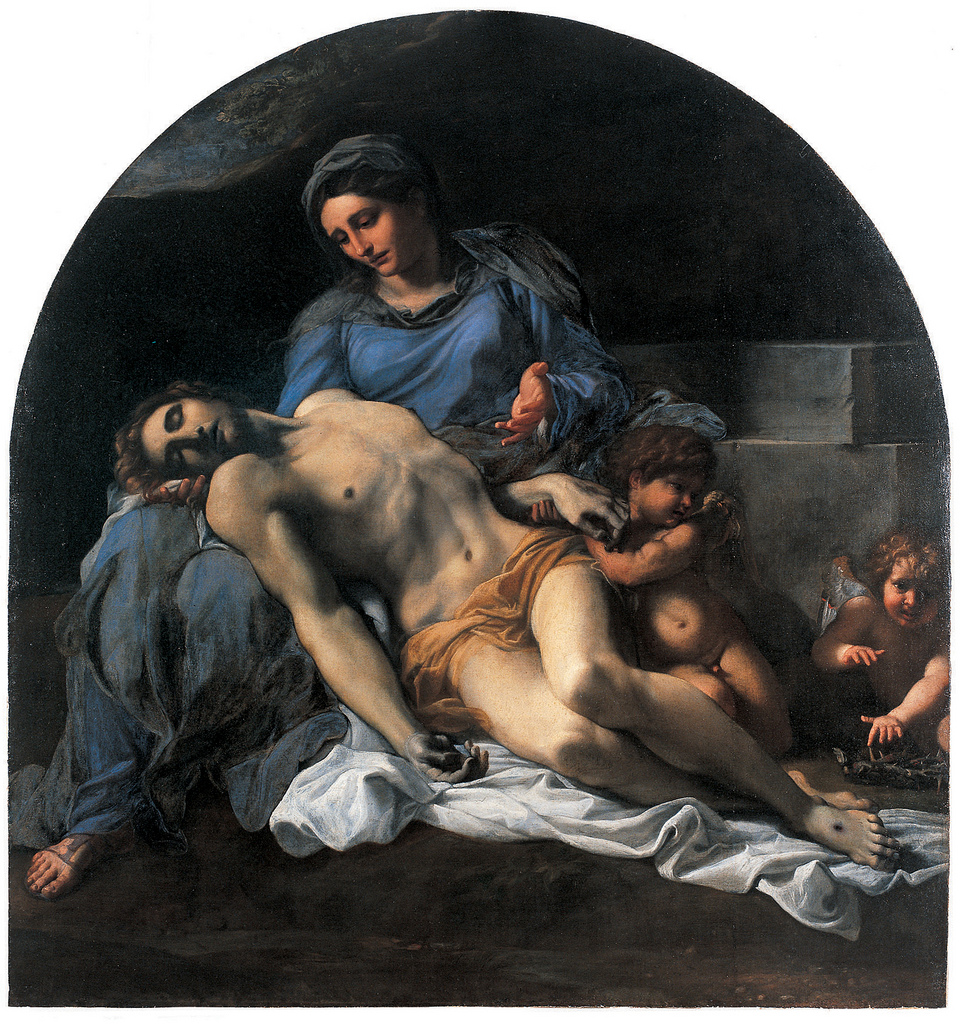
Pietà, c. 1600, Annibale Carracci, National Museum of Capodimonte

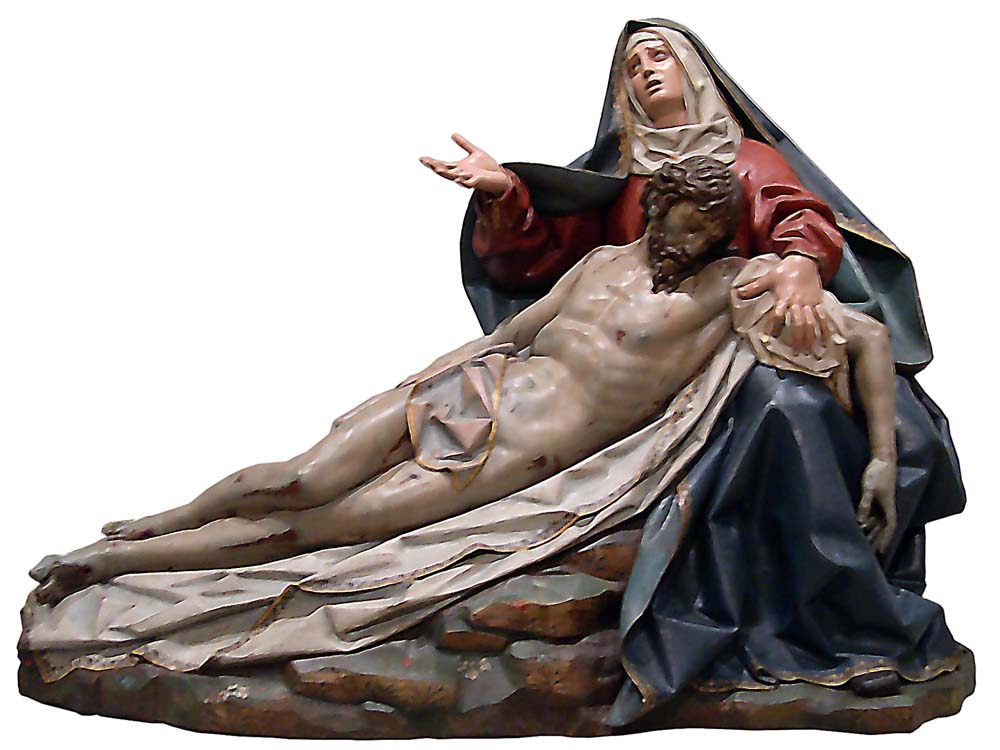
Pietà by Gregorio Fernández, 1616–1619, National Sculpture Museum, painted wood for a processional float

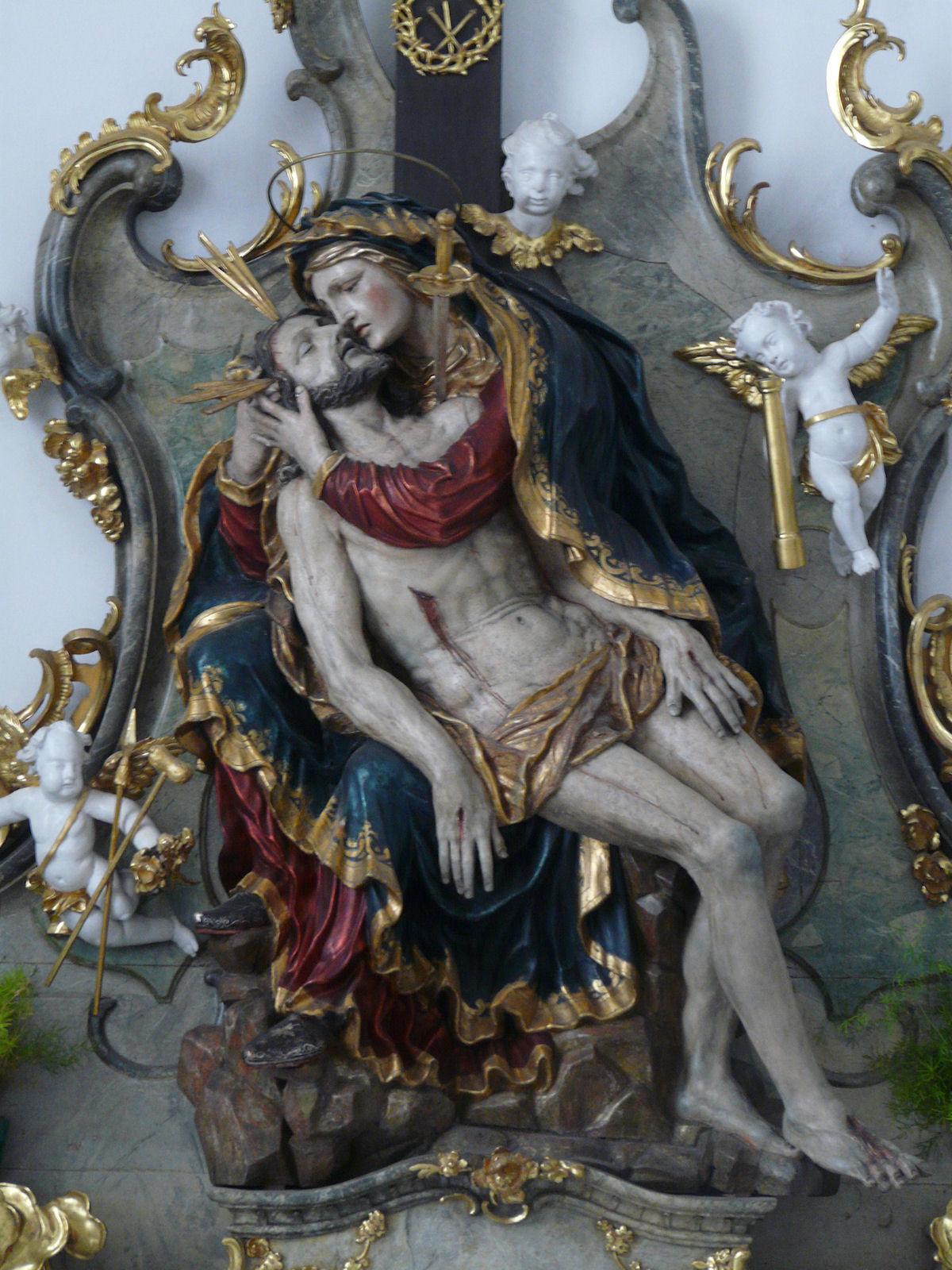
18th-century Bavarian example with Rococo setting

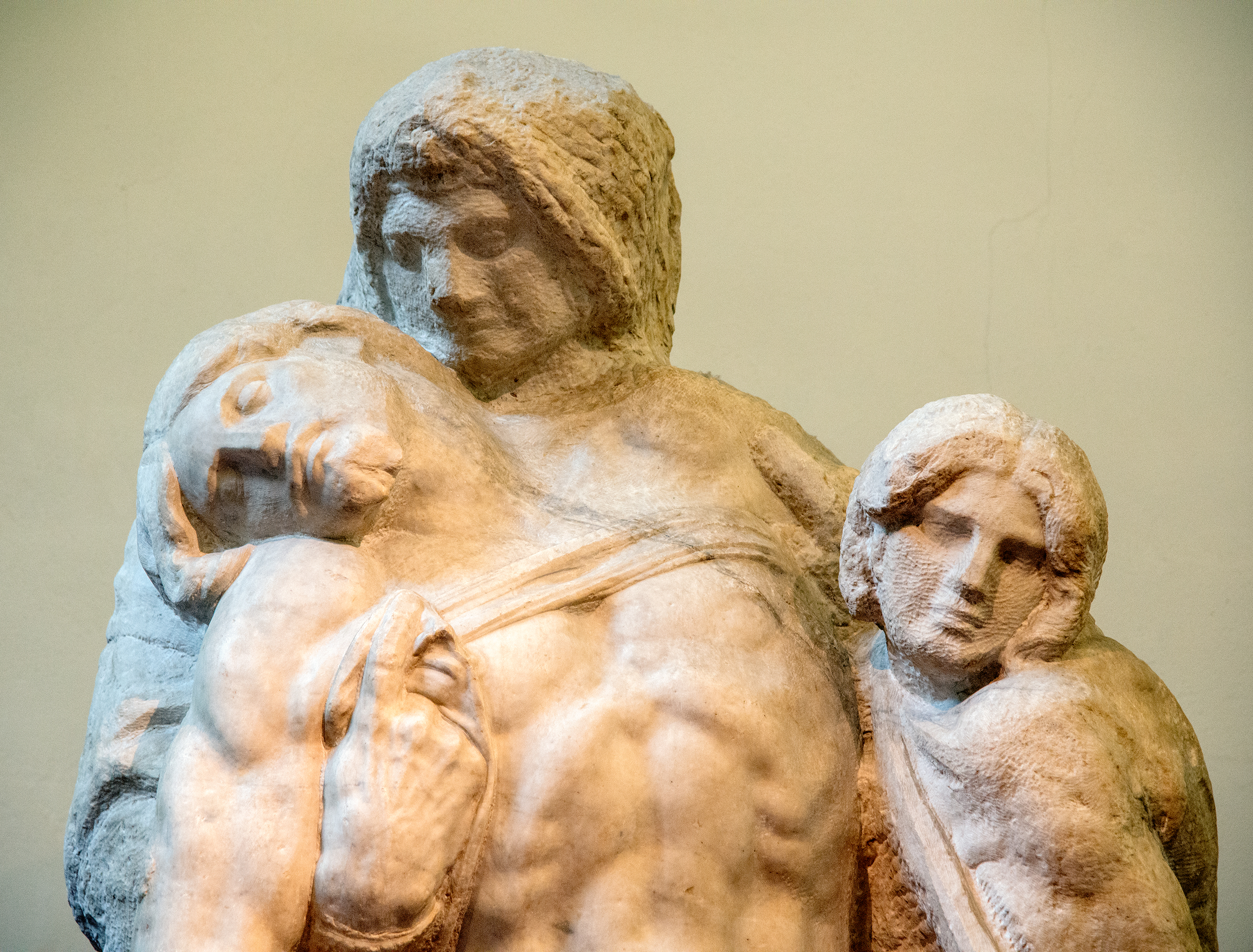
The Palestrina Pietà originally attributed to Michelangelo but probably by another sculptor

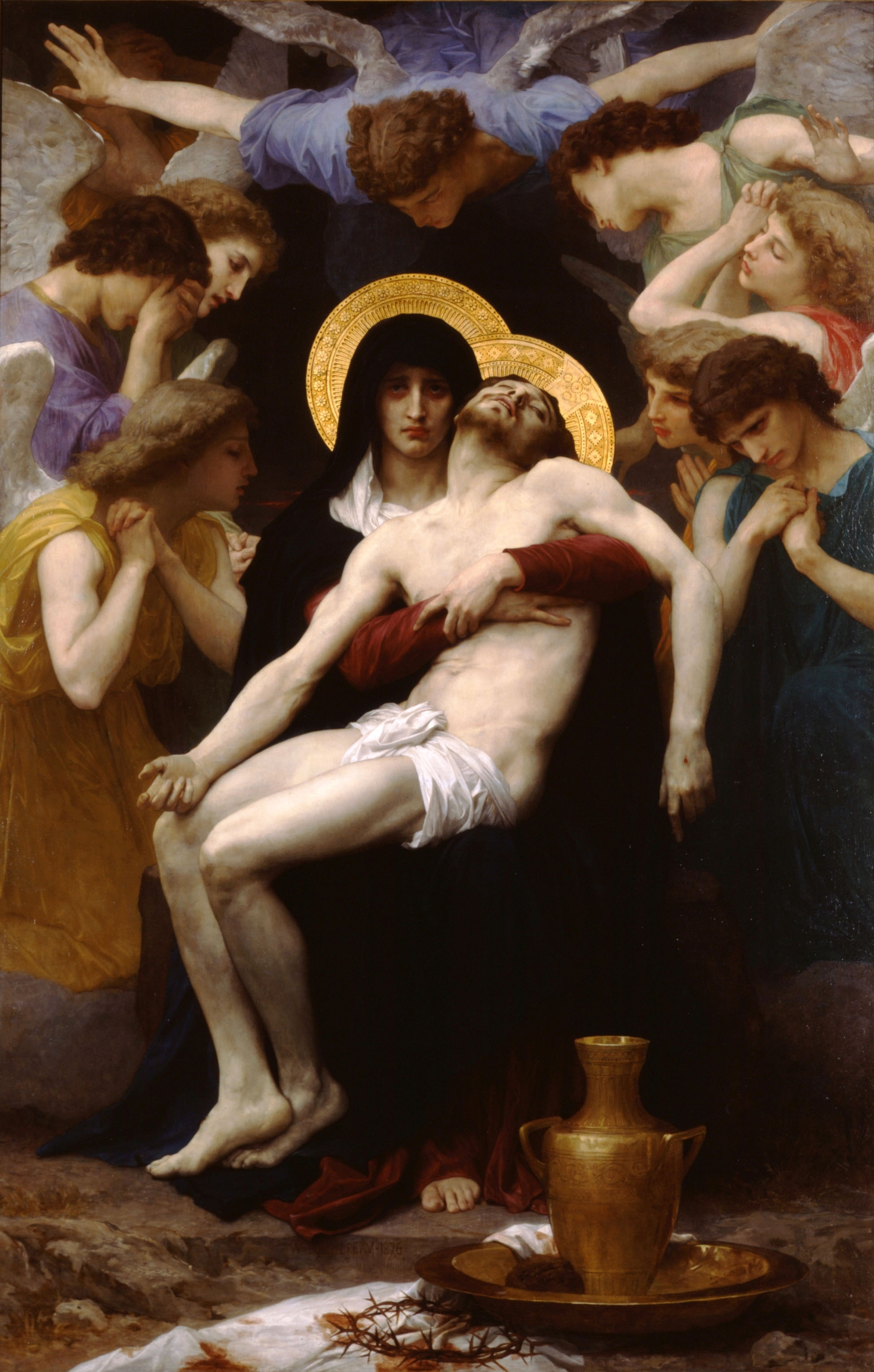
Pieta, 1876, William-Adolphe Bouguereau

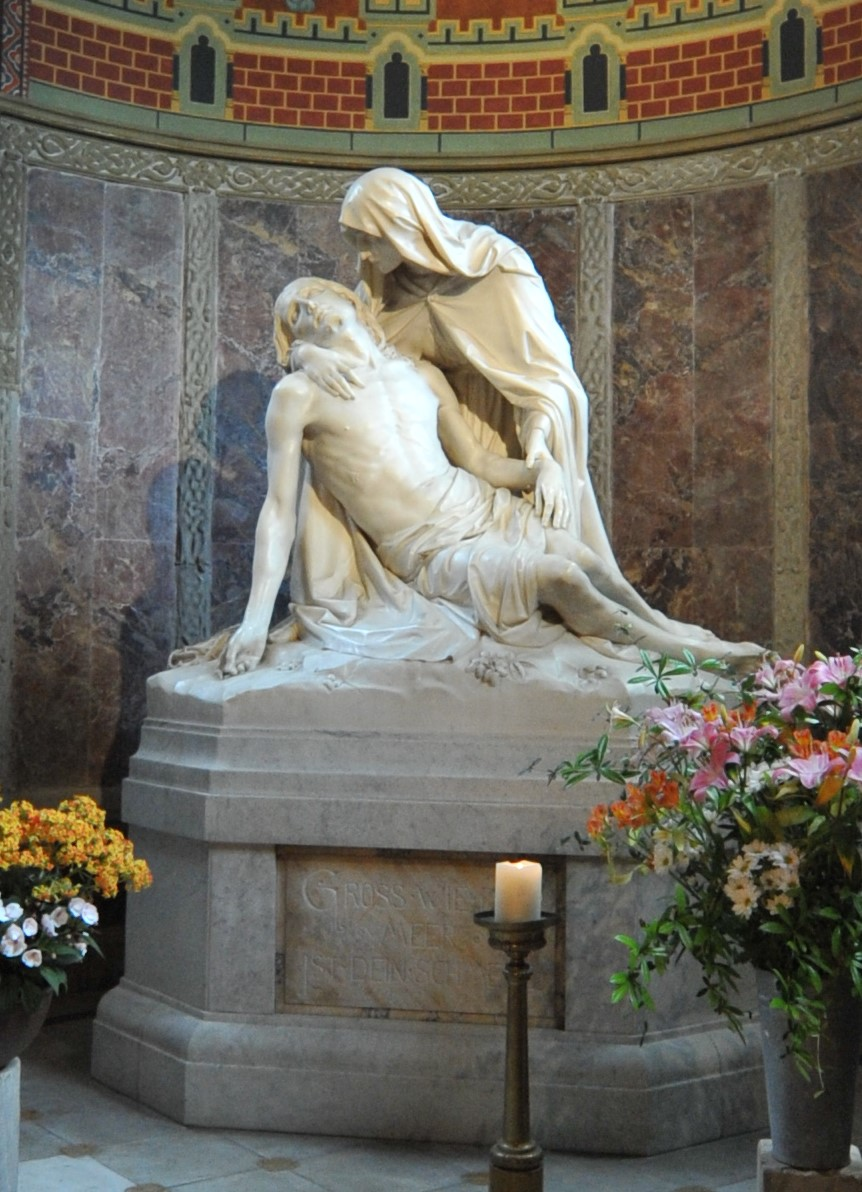
A Pietà in marble by Anton Josef Reiss, 1897

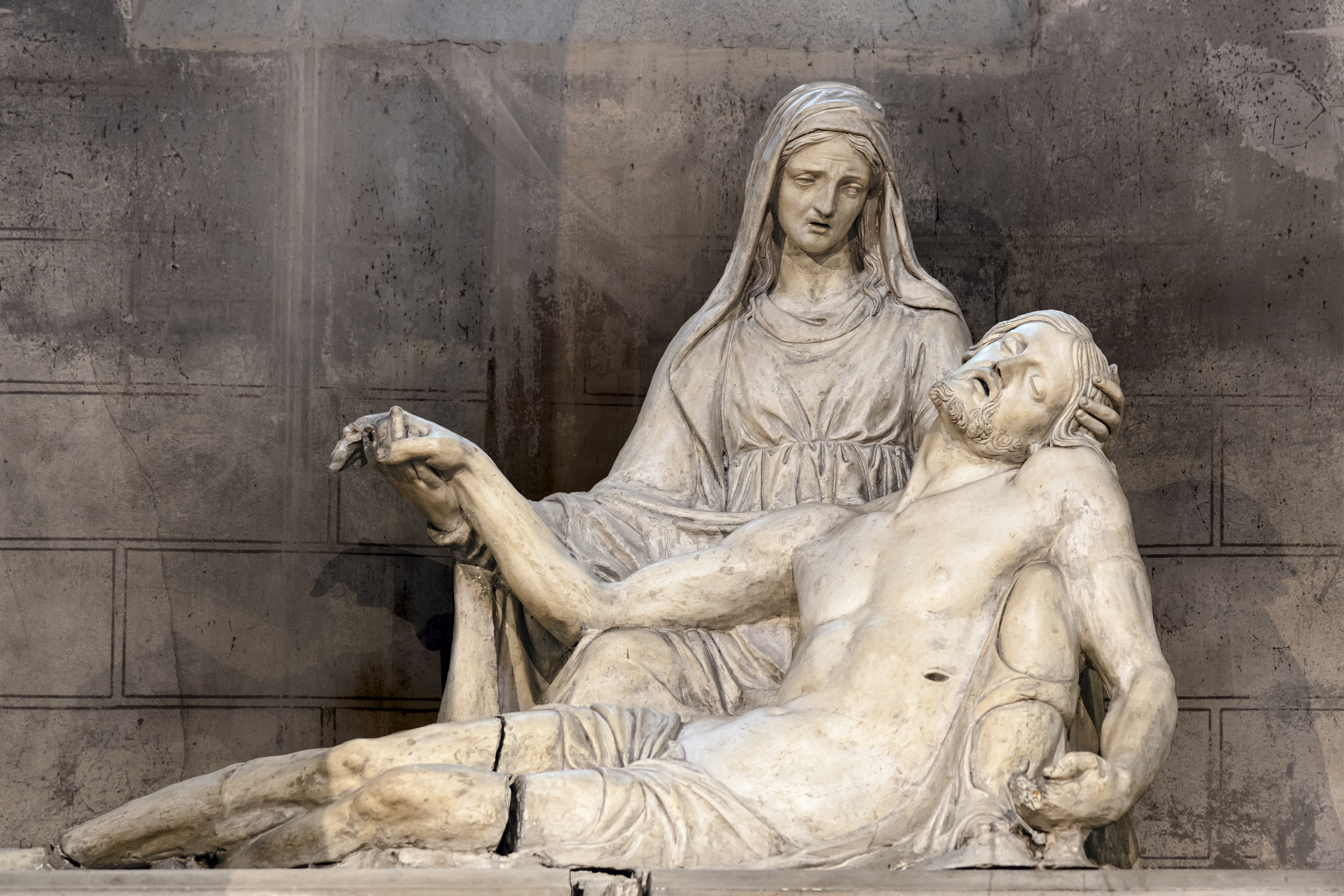
Vierge de Pitié, Déploration at Collégiale Saint-Salvi d'Albi, Albi, around 1900

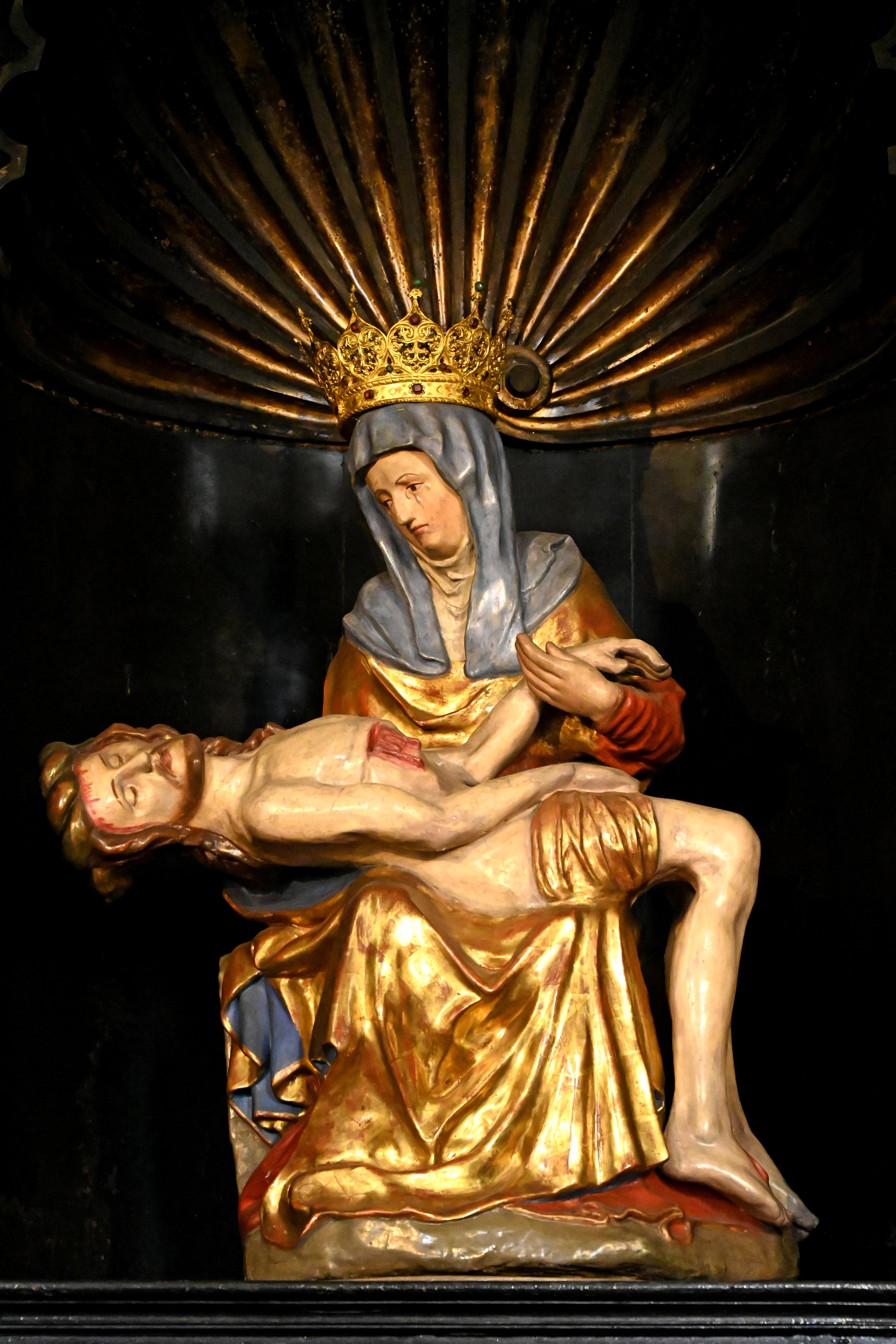
Pieta of Kampbornhofen, Germany

== See also ==
- List of statues of Jesus
- Pietà (Michelangelo)
