= Pietà of Villeneuve-lès-Avignon =

15th-century oil painting

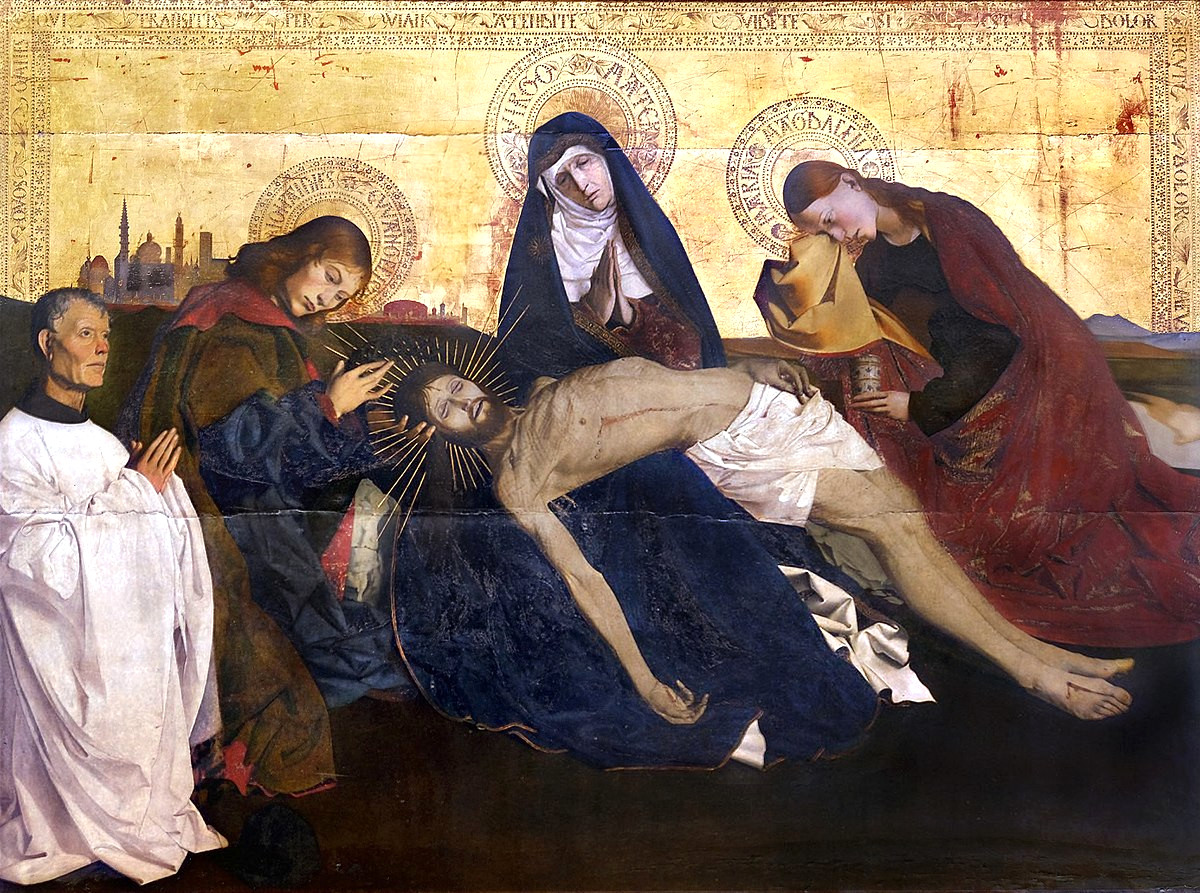
Enguerrand Quarton. Pietà of Villeneuve-lès-Avignon. Oil on wood, 163cm x 219cm. Musée du Louvre

Pietà of Villeneuve-lès-Avignon is an oil painting of the mid-15th century that is considered one of the outstanding works of art of the late Middle Ages. Following its appearance at an exhibition in 1904 its authorship was disputed, though it has since been accepted as the work of Enguerrand Quarton. It is now in the Musée du Louvre.

The Pietà, where the dead Christ is supported by his grieving mother, is a common theme of late-medieval religious art, but this is one of the most striking depictions, "perhaps the greatest masterpiece produced in France in the 15th century" (Edward Lucie-Smith). It is distinctive from previous depictions of the subject—which were often characterized by overt displays of grief and trauma—by virtue of its restraint. The composition is stable, with the Virgin's hands together in prayer, rather than clutching the body of Christ. The curved back form of Christ's body is highly original, and the stark, motionless dignity of the other figures is very different from Italian or Netherlandish depictions. The style of the painting is unique for its time: the grouping of the figures appears somewhat primitive, yet the conception evidences both great breadth and delicacy, the latter quality especially evident in the specificity of the portraits and the elegant gesture of St. John's hands at Christ's head.

The bare background landscape falls away to a horizon broken by the buildings of Jerusalem, but instead of a sky there is plain gold leaf with stamped and incised haloes, borders and inscriptions. The clerical donor, portrayed with Netherlandish realism, kneels to the left. The painting came from Villeneuve-lès-Avignon, just across the Rhône from Avignon, and is sometimes known as the "Villeneuve Pietà". It can also be suggested that the buildings depicted on the left background are an imaginary representation of Istanbul and the church of Hagia Sophia. The city had fallen to the Ottomans in 1453, a few years before the estimated creation of the painting and the main subject (Pieta) can be considered as a lament to the fall of the eastern part of Christendom.

Before its widely accepted attribution to Quarton, some art historians thought the painting might be by a Catalan or Portuguese master; it was, according to art historian Lawrence Gowing, "the subject of dispute among protagonists of every school along the seaboard between Lisbon and Messina." Quarton, known to be working in Avignon by 1447, painted two pictures there in the early 1450s which bear comparison to this painting.

For Gowing,

The agony of the picture is suffered with a rare restraint. No demonstrative expression could match the tragedy of this body, distended as if dreaming. We are in the presence of the simplicity of sorrow. Against the bare skyline, in the gray-gold of the medieval twilight, the scene seems inexpressibly grand.
