= Renaissance art =

Visual arts produced during the European Renaissance

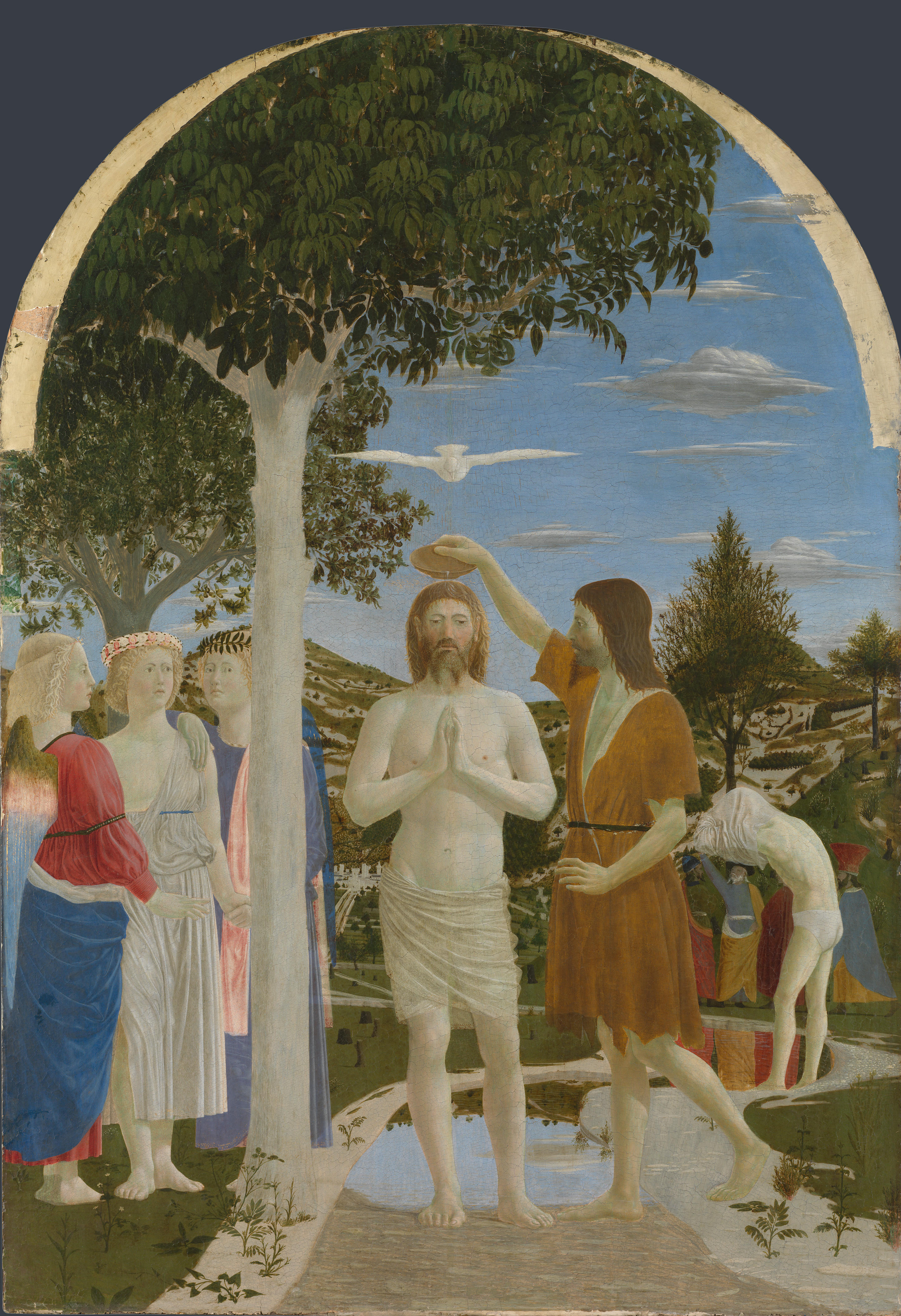
Piero della Francesca, The Baptism of Christ in the Prado Museum, 1450

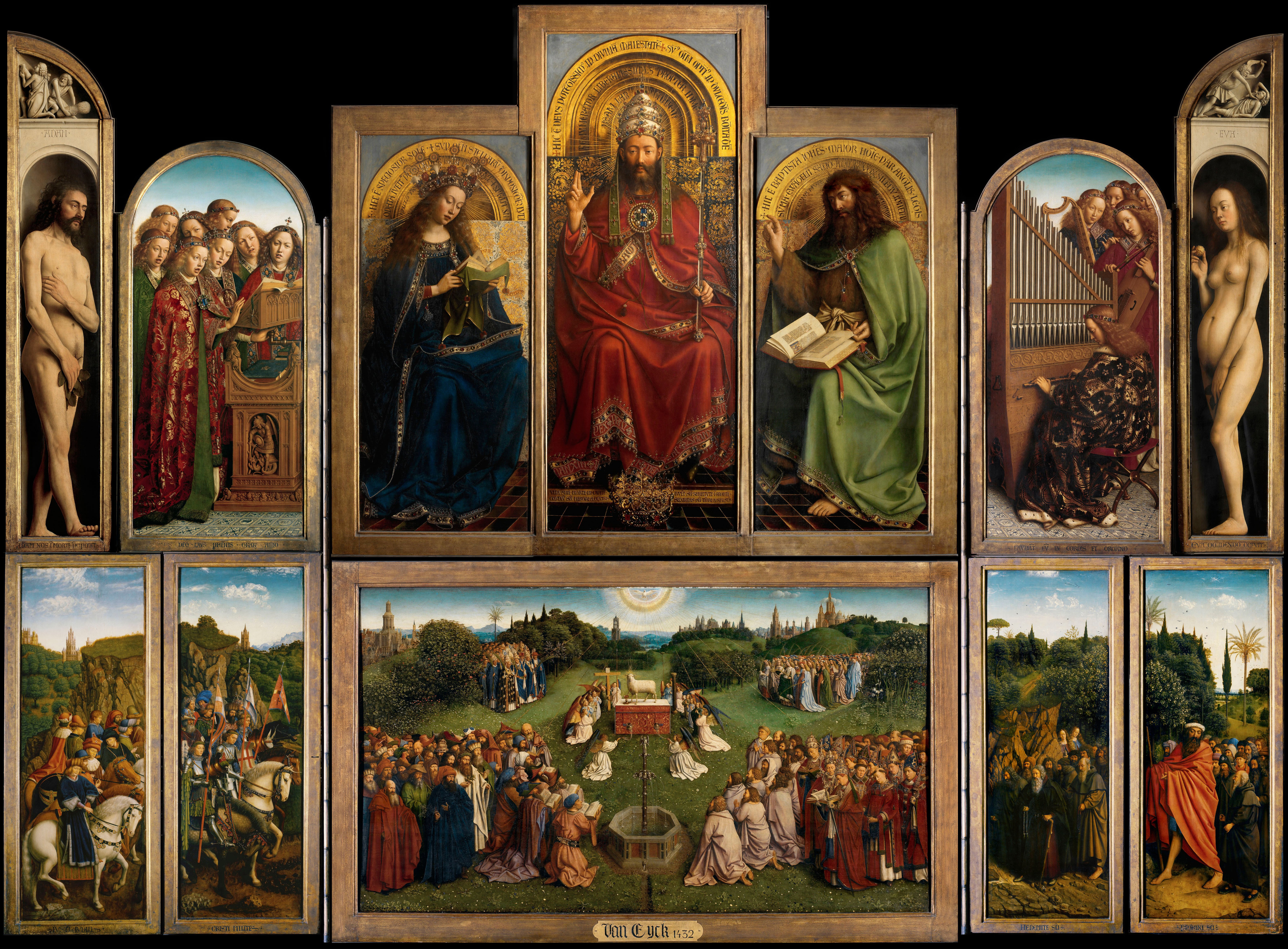
Jan van Eyck, The Ghent Altarpiece: The Adoration of the Mystic Lamb (interior view), 1432

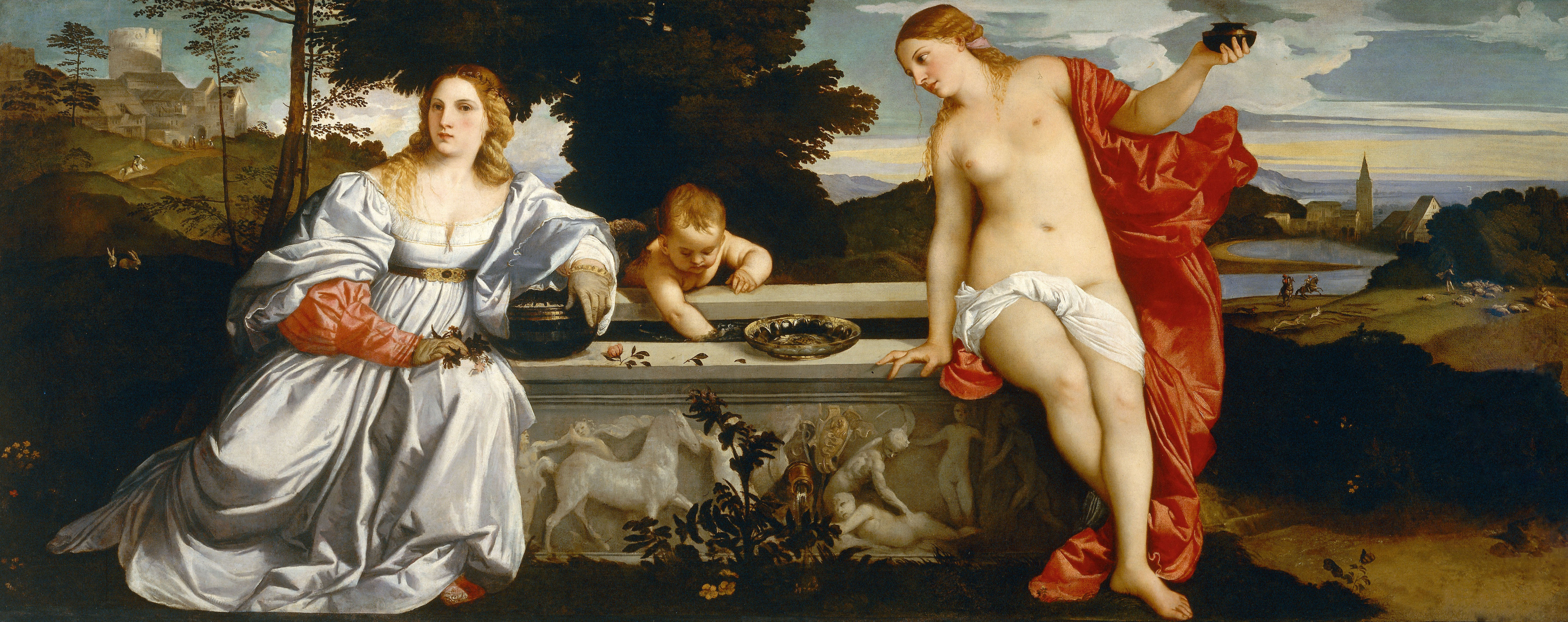
Titian, Sacred and Profane Love, c. 1513 – 1514, Galleria Borghese, Rome

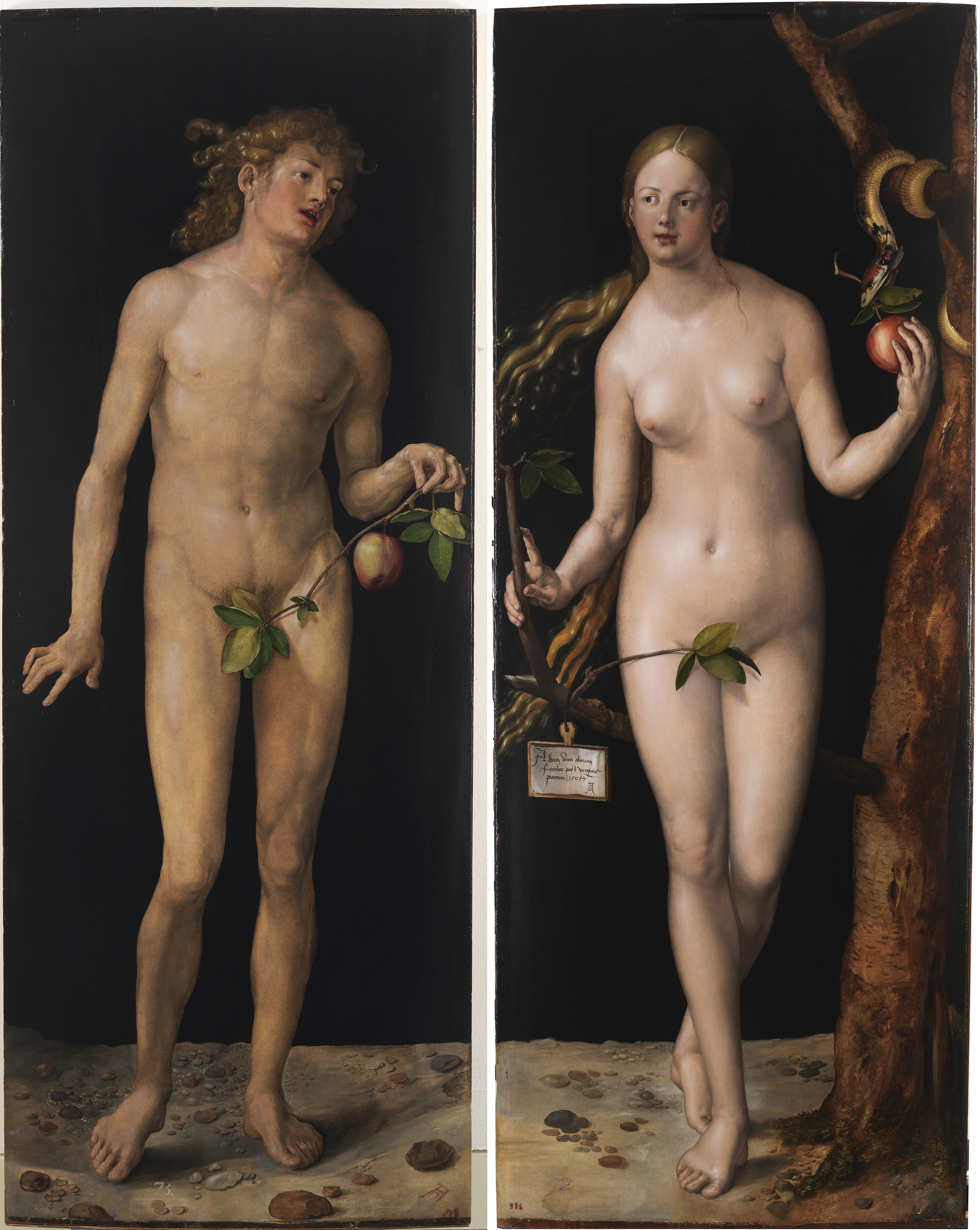
Albrecht Dürer, Adam and Eve, 1507, Museo del Prado, Madrid

Renaissance art (1350 – 1620) is the painting, sculpture, and decorative arts of the period of European history known as the Renaissance, which emerged as a distinct style in Italy in about AD 1400, in parallel with developments which occurred in philosophy, literature, music, science, and technology. Renaissance art took as its foundation the art of Classical antiquity, perceived as the noblest of ancient traditions, but transformed that tradition by absorbing recent developments in the art of Northern Europe and by applying contemporary scientific knowledge. Along with Renaissance humanist philosophy, it spread throughout Europe, affecting both artists and their patrons with the development of new techniques and new artistic sensibilities. For art historians, Renaissance art marks the transition of Europe from the medieval period to the Early Modern age.

Sandro Botticelli, The Birth of Venus, c. 1485, Uffizi, Florence

The body of art, including painting, sculpture, architecture, music and literature identified as "Renaissance art" was primarily produced during the 14th, 15th, and 16th centuries in Europe under the combined influences of an increased awareness of nature, a revival of classical learning, and a more individualistic view of man. Scholars no longer believe that the Renaissance marked an abrupt break with medieval values, as is suggested by the French word renaissance, literally meaning "rebirth". In many parts of Europe, Early Renaissance art was created in parallel with Late Medieval art.

== Origins ==
Many influences on the development of Renaissance men and women in the early 15th century have been credited with the emergence of Renaissance art; they are the same as those that affected philosophy, literature, architecture, theology, science, government, and other aspects of society. The following list presents a summary of changes to social and cultural conditions that have been identified as factors that contributed to the development of Renaissance art. Each is dealt with more fully in the main articles cited above. The scholars of the Renaissance period focused on present life and ways to improve human life. They did not pay much attention to medieval philosophy or religion. During this period, scholars and humanists like Erasmus, Dante, and Petrarch criticized superstitious beliefs and also questioned them. The concept of education also widened its spectrum and focused more on creating 'an ideal man' who would have a fair understanding of arts, music, poetry and literature and would have the ability to appreciate these aspects of life.

- Classical texts, lost to European scholars for centuries, became available. These included documents of philosophy, prose, poetry, drama, science, a thesis on the arts, and early Christian theology.
- Europe gained access to advanced mathematics, which had its provenance in the works of Islamic scholars.
- The advent of movable type printing in the 15th century meant that ideas could be disseminated easily, and an increasing number of books were written for a broader public.
- The establishment of the Medici Bank and the subsequent trade it generated brought unprecedented wealth to a single Italian city, Florence.
- Cosimo de' Medici set a new standard for patronage of the arts, not associated with the church or monarchy.
- Humanist philosophy meant that man's relationship with humanity, the universe and God was no longer the exclusive province of the church.
- A revived interest in the Classics brought about the first archaeological study of Roman remains by the architect Brunelleschi and sculptor Donatello. The revival of a style of architecture based on classical precedents inspired a corresponding classicism in painting and sculpture, which manifested itself as early as the 1420s in the paintings of Masaccio and Uccello.
- The improvement of oil paint and developments in oil-painting technique by Belgian and French artists such as Robert Campin, Jan van Eyck, Rogier van der Weyden and Hugo van der Goes led to its adoption in Italy from about 1475 and had ultimately lasting effects on painting practices worldwide.
- The serendipitous presence within the region of Florence in the early 15th century of certain individuals of artistic genius, most notably Masaccio, Brunelleschi, Ghiberti, Piero della Francesca, Donatello and Michelozzo formed an ethos out of which sprang the great masters of the High Renaissance, as well as supporting and encouraging many lesser artists to achieve work of extraordinary quality.
- A similar heritage of artistic achievement occurred in Venice through the talented Bellini family, their influential in-law Mantegna, Giorgione, Titian and Tintoretto.
- The publication of two treatises by Leone Battista Alberti, De pictura ("On Painting") in 1435 and De re aedificatoria ("Ten Books on Architecture") in 1452.

== History ==
=== Proto-Renaissance in Italy, 1280–1400 ===
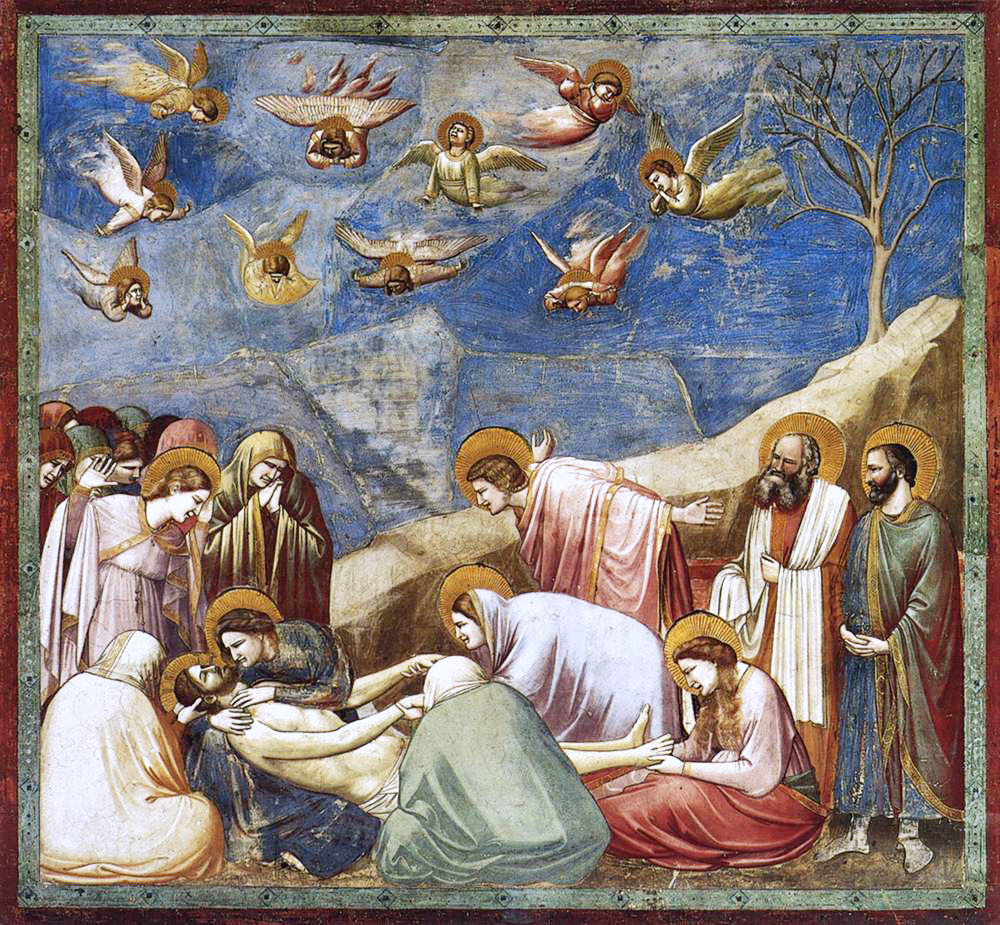
Giotto: The Lamentation, c. 1305, Scrovegni Chapel, foreshadows the Renaissance.

In Italy in the late 13th and early 14th centuries, the sculpture of Nicola Pisano and his son Giovanni Pisano, working at Pisa, Siena and Pistoia shows markedly classicising tendencies, probably influenced by the familiarity of these artists with ancient Roman sarcophagi. Their masterpieces are the pulpits of the Baptistery and Cathedral of Pisa.

Contemporary with Giovanni Pisano, the Florentine painter Giotto developed a manner of figurative painting that was unprecedentedly naturalistic, three-dimensional, lifelike and classicist, when compared with that of his contemporaries and teacher Cimabue. Giotto, whose greatest work is the cycle of the Life of Christ at the Arena Chapel in Padua, was seen by the 16th-century biographer Giorgio Vasari as "rescuing and restoring art" from the "crude, traditional, Byzantine style" prevalent in Italy in the 13th century.

=== Early Renaissance in Italy, 1400–1495 ===
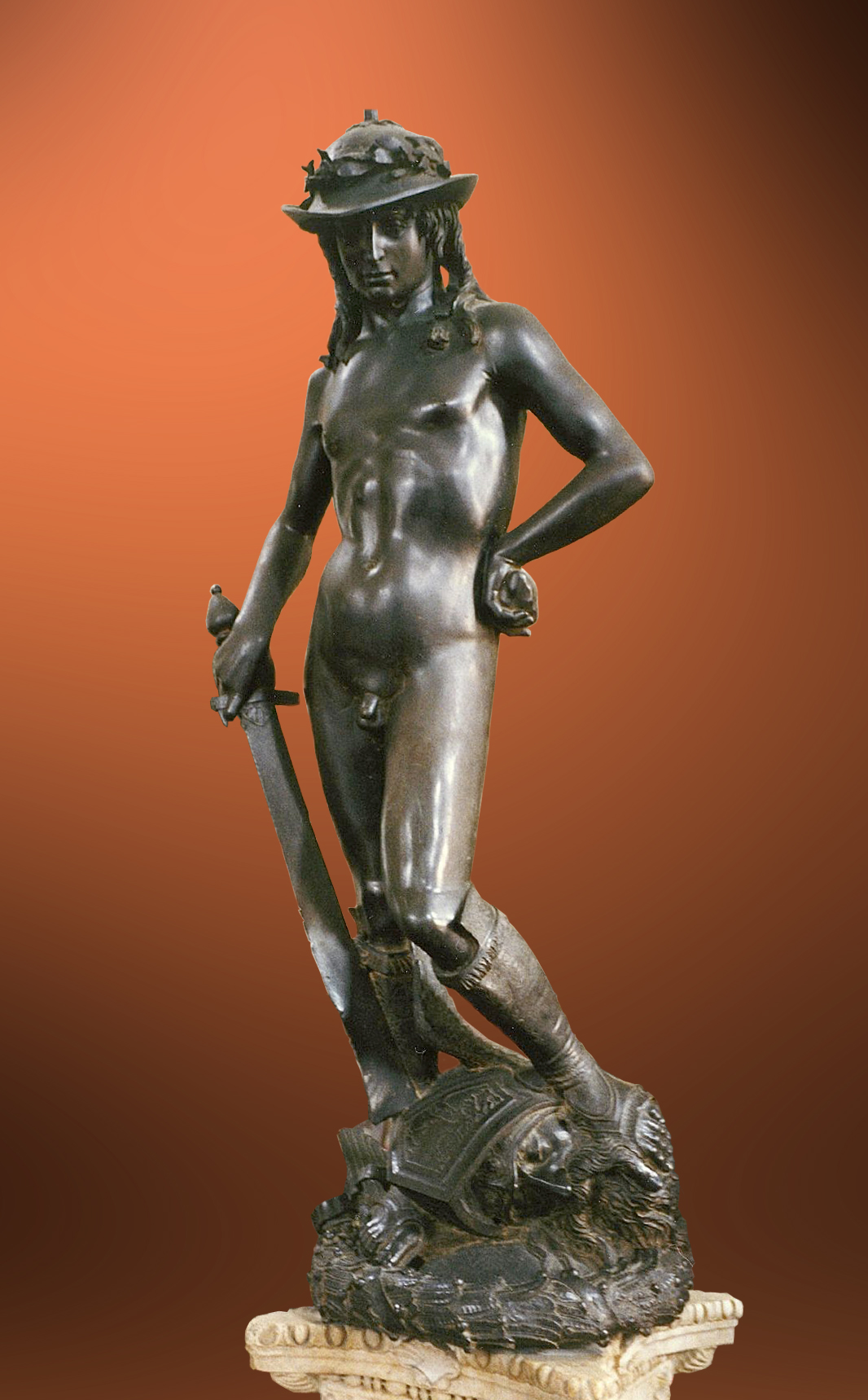
Donatello, David (1440s?). Museo Nazionale del Bargello.

Although both the Pisanos and Giotto had students and followers, the first truly Renaissance artists were not to emerge in Florence until 1401 with the competition to sculpt a set of bronze doors of the Baptistery of Florence Cathedral, which drew entries from seven young sculptors including Brunelleschi, Donatello and the winner, Lorenzo Ghiberti. Brunelleschi, most famous as the architect of the dome of Florence Cathedral and the Church of San Lorenzo, created a number of sculptural works, including a life-sized crucifix in Santa Maria Novella, renowned for its naturalism. His studies of perspective are thought to have influenced the painter Masaccio. Donatello became renowned as the greatest sculptor of the Early Renaissance, his masterpieces being his humanist and unusually erotic statue of David, one of the icons of the Florentine republic, and his great monument to Gattamelata, the first large equestrian bronze to be created since Roman times.

The contemporary of Donatello, Masaccio, was the painterly descendant of Giotto and began the Early Renaissance in Italian painting in 1425, furthering the trend towards solidity of form and naturalism of face and gesture that Giotto had begun a century earlier. From 1425 to 1428, Masaccio completed several panel paintings but is best known for the fresco cycle that he began in the Brancacci Chapel with the older artist Masolino and which had a profound influence on later painters, including Michelangelo. Masaccio's developments were carried forward in the paintings of Fra Angelico, particularly in his frescos at the Convent of San Marco in Florence.

The treatment of the elements of perspective and light in painting was of particular concern to 15th-century Florentine painters. Uccello was so obsessed with trying to achieve an appearance of perspective that, according to Giorgio Vasari, it disturbed his sleep. His solutions can be seen in his masterpiece set of three paintings, the Battle of San Romano, which is believed to have been completed by 1460. Piero della Francesca made systematic and scientific studies of both light and linear perspective, the results of which can be seen in his fresco cycle of The History of the True Cross in San Francesco, Arezzo.

In Naples, the painter Antonello da Messina began using oil paints for portraits and religious paintings at a date that preceded other Italian painters, possibly about 1450. He carried this technique north and influenced the painters of Venice. One of the most significant painters of Northern Italy was Andrea Mantegna, who decorated the interior of a room, the Camera degli Sposi for his patron Ludovico Gonzaga, setting portraits of the family and court into an illusionistic architectural space.

The end period of the Early Renaissance in Italian art is marked, like its beginning, by a particular commission that drew artists together, this time in cooperation rather than competition. Pope Sixtus IV had rebuilt the Papal Chapel, named the Sistine Chapel in his honour, and commissioned a group of artists, Sandro Botticelli, Pietro Perugino, Domenico Ghirlandaio and Cosimo Rosselli to decorate its wall with fresco cycles depicting the Life of Christ and the Life of Moses. In the sixteen large paintings, the artists, although each working in his individual style, agreed on principles of format, and utilised the techniques of lighting, linear and atmospheric perspective, anatomy, foreshortening and characterisation that had been carried to a high point in the large Florentine studios of Ghiberti, Verrocchio, Ghirlandaio and Perugino.

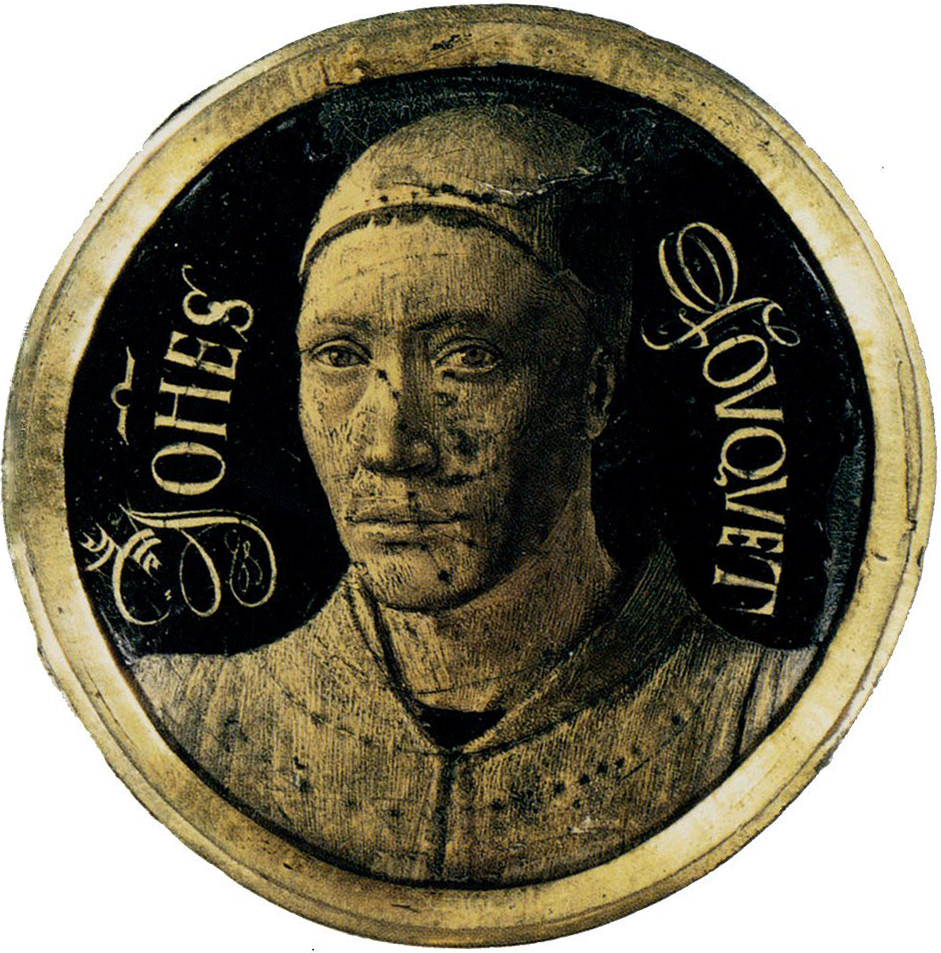
Jean Fouquet, self-portrait (1450). The earliest portrait miniature, and possibly the earliest formal self-portrait.

=== Early Netherlandish art, 1425–1525 ===
Rogier van der Weyden, The Descent from the Cross (c. 1435), oil on oak panel, 220 cm × 262 cm (87 in × 103 in). Museo del Prado, Madrid.

The painters of the Low Countries in this period included Jan van Eyck, his brother Hubert van Eyck, Robert Campin, Hans Memling, Rogier van der Weyden and Hugo van der Goes. Their painting developed partly independently of Early Italian Renaissance painting, and without the influence of a deliberate and conscious striving to revive antiquity.

The style of painting grew directly out of medieval painting in tempera, on panels and illuminated manuscripts, and other forms such as stained glass; the medium of fresco was less common in northern Europe. The medium used was oil paint, which had long been utilised for painting leather ceremonial shields and accoutrements because it was flexible and relatively durable. The earliest Netherlandish oil paintings are meticulous and detailed like tempera paintings. The material lent itself to the depiction of tonal variations and texture, so facilitating the observation of nature in great detail.

The Netherlandish painters did not approach the creation of a picture through a framework of linear perspective and correct proportion. They maintained a medieval view of hierarchical proportion and religious symbolism, while delighting in a realistic treatment of material elements, both natural and man-made. Jan van Eyck, with his brother Hubert, painted The Altarpiece of the Mystical Lamb. It is probable that Antonello da Messina became familiar with Van Eyck's work, while in Naples or Sicily. In 1475, Hugo van der Goes' Portinari Altarpiece arrived in Florence, where it was to have a profound influence on many painters, most immediately Domenico Ghirlandaio, who painted an altarpiece imitating its elements.

A very significant Netherlandish painter towards the end of the period was Hieronymus Bosch, who employed the type of fanciful forms that were often utilized to decorate borders and letters in illuminated manuscripts, combining plant and animal forms with architectonic ones. When taken from the context of the illumination and peopled with humans, these forms give Bosch's paintings a surreal quality which have no parallel in the work of any other Renaissance painter. His masterpiece is the triptych The Garden of Earthly Delights.

=== Early Renaissance in France, 1375–1528 ===
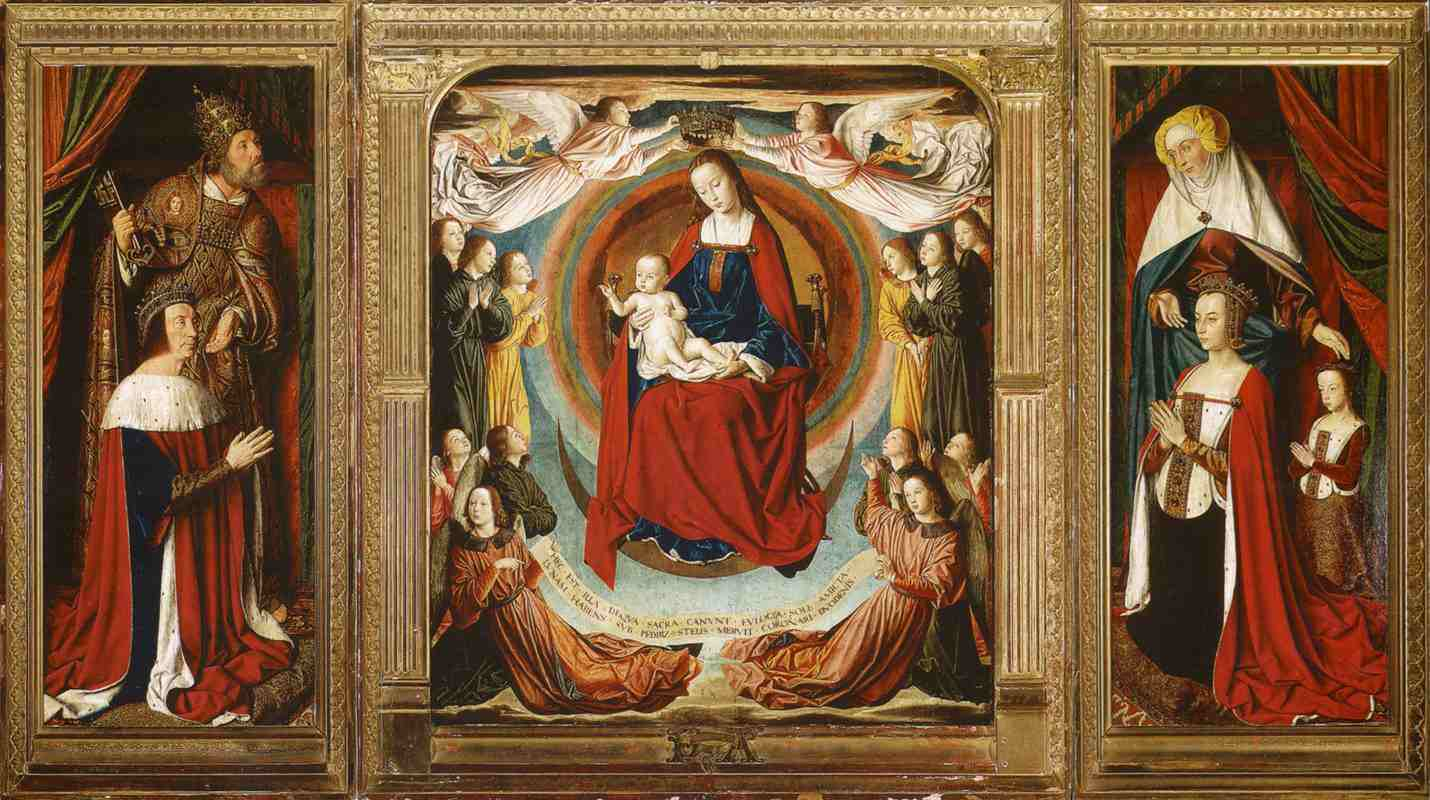
Jean Hey, The Moulins Triptych, c. 1498, oil on panel, Moulins Cathedral

The artists of France (including duchies such as Burgundy) were often associated with courts, providing illuminated manuscripts and portraits for the nobility as well as devotional paintings and altarpieces. Among the most famous were the Limbourg brothers, Flemish illuminators and creators of the Très Riches Heures du Duc de Berry manuscript illumination. Jean Fouquet, painter of the royal court, visited Italy in 1437 and reflects the influence of Florentine painters such as Paolo Uccello. Although best known for his portraits such as that of Charles VII of France, Fouquet also created illuminations, and is thought to be the inventor of the portrait miniature.

There were a number of artists at this date who painted famous altarpieces, that are stylistically quite distinct from both the Italian and the Flemish. These include two enigmatic figures, Enguerrand Quarton, to whom is ascribed the Pieta of Villeneuve-lès-Avignon, and Jean Hey, otherwise known as "the Master of Moulins" after his most famous work, the Moulins Altarpiece. In these works, realism and close observation of the human figure, emotions and lighting are combined with a medieval formality, which includes gilt backgrounds.

=== High Renaissance in Italy, 1495–1520 ===
The "universal genius" Leonardo da Vinci further perfected the aspects of pictorial art (lighting, linear and atmospheric perspective, anatomy, foreshortening, and characterisation) that had preoccupied artists of the Early Renaissance in a lifetime of studying and meticulously recording his observations of the natural world. His adoption of oil paint as his primary media meant that he could depict light and its effects on the landscape and objects more naturally and with greater dramatic effect than had ever been done before, as demonstrated in the Mona Lisa (1503–1506). His dissection of cadavers carried forward the understanding of skeletal and muscular anatomy, as seen in the unfinished Saint Jerome in the Wilderness (c. 1480). His depiction of human emotion in The Last Supper, completed 1495–1498, set the benchmark for religious painting.

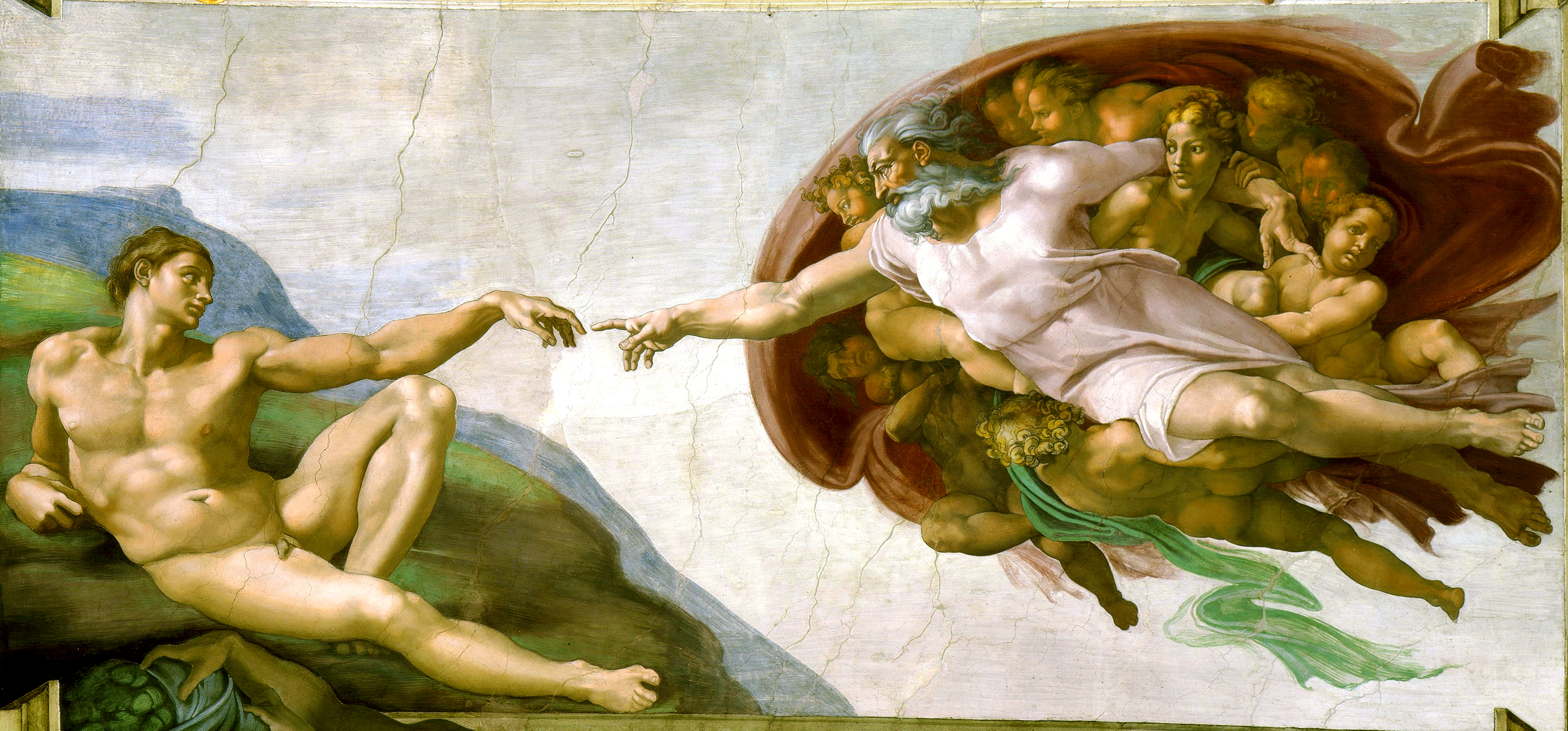
Michelangelo, The Creation of Adam, c. 1511, from the Sistine Chapel ceiling

The art of Leonardo's younger contemporary Michelangelo took a very different direction. Michelangelo in neither his painting nor his sculpture demonstrates any interest in the observation of any natural object except the human body. He perfected his technique in depicting it, while in his early twenties, by the creation of the enormous marble statue of David and the group Pietà, in the St Peter's Basilica, Rome. He then set about an exploration of the expressive possibilities of the human anatomy. His commission by Pope Julius II to paint the Sistine Chapel ceiling resulted in the supreme masterpiece of figurative composition, which was to have profound effect on every subsequent generation of European artists. His later work, The Last Judgement, painted on the altar wall of the Sistine Chapel between 1534 and 1541, shows a Mannerist (also called Late Renaissance) style with generally elongated bodies which took over from the High Renaissance style between 1520 and 1530.

Standing alongside Leonardo and Michelangelo as the third great painter of the High Renaissance was the younger Raphael, who in a short lifespan painted a great number of lifelike and engaging portraits, including those of Pope Julius II and his successor Pope Leo X, and numerous portrayals of the Madonna and Christ Child, including the Sistine Madonna. His death in 1520 at age 37 is considered by many art historians to be the end of the High Renaissance period, although some individual artists continued working in the High Renaissance style for many years thereafter.

In Northern Italy, the High Renaissance is represented primarily by members of the Venetian school, especially by the latter works of Giovanni Bellini, especially religious paintings, which include several large altarpieces of a type known as "Sacred Conversation", which show a group of saints around the enthroned Madonna. His contemporary Giorgione, who died at about the age of 32 in 1510, left a small number of enigmatic works, including The Tempest, the subject of which has remained a matter of speculation. The earliest works of Titian date from the era of the High Renaissance, including the massive altarpiece The Assumption of the Virgin, which combines human action and drama with spectacular colour and atmosphere. Titian continued painting in a generally High Renaissance style until near the end of his career in the 1570s, although he increasingly used colour and light over line to define his figures.

=== German Renaissance art ===
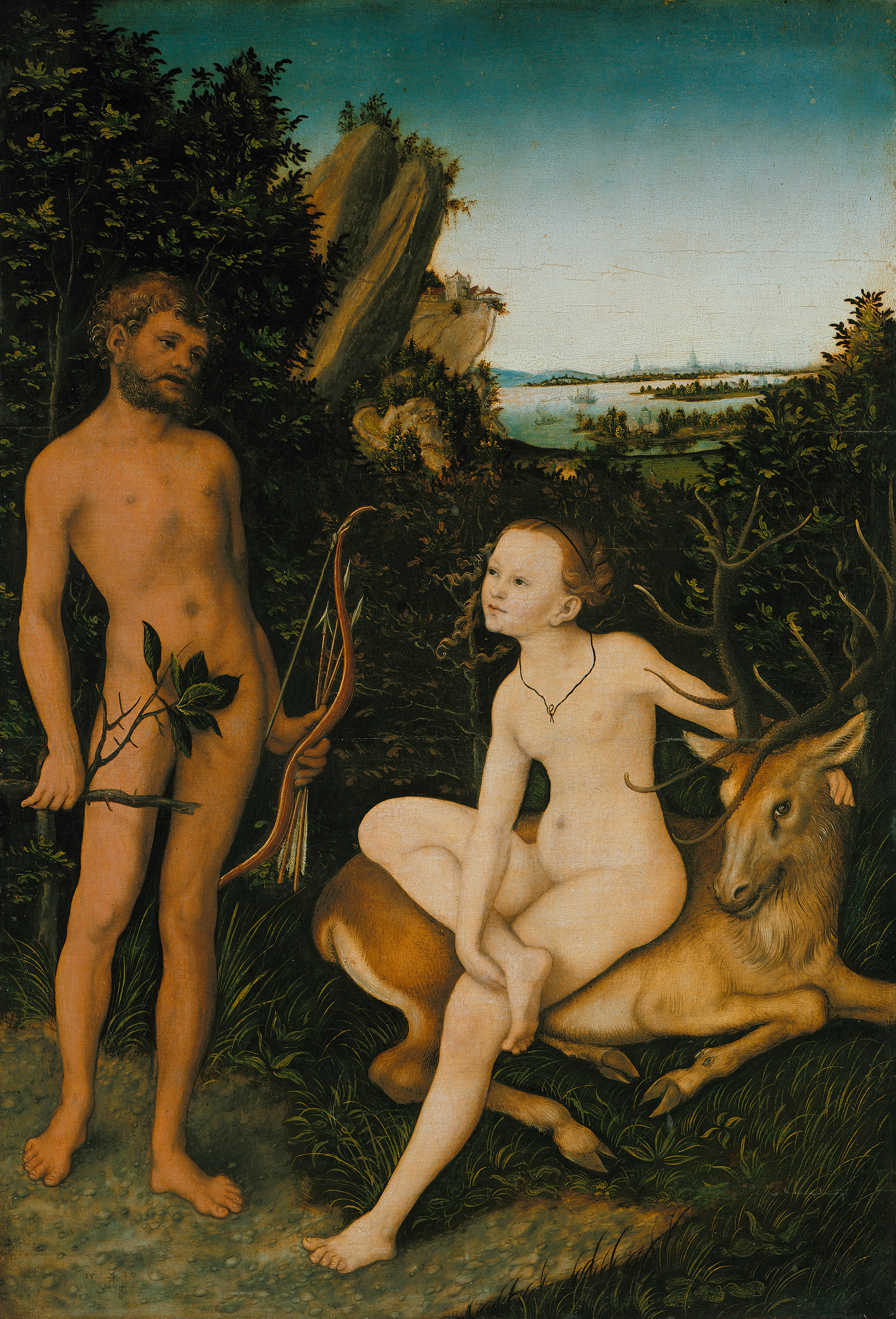
Lucas Cranach the Elder, Apollo and Diana

German Renaissance art falls into the broader category of the Renaissance in Northern Europe, also known as the Northern Renaissance. Renaissance influences began to appear in German art in the 15th century, but this trend was not widespread. Gardner's Art Through the Ages identifies Michael Pacher, a painter and sculptor, as the first German artist whose work begins to show Italian Renaissance influences. According to that source, Pacher's painting, St. Wolfgang Forces the Devil to Hold His Prayerbook (c. 1481), is Late Gothic in style, but also shows the influence of the Italian artist Mantegna.

In the 1500s, Renaissance art in Germany became more common as, according to Gardner, "The art of northern Europe during the sixteenth century is characterized by a sudden awareness of the advances made by the Italian Renaissance and by a desire to assimilate this new style as rapidly as possible." One of the best known practitioners of German Renaissance art was Albrecht Dürer (1471–1528), whose fascination with classical ideas led him to Italy to study art. Both Gardner and Russell recognized the importance of Dürer's contribution to German art in bringing Italian Renaissance styles and ideas to Germany. Russell calls this "Opening the Gothic windows of German art", while Gardner calls it Dürer's "life mission". Importantly, as Gardner points out, Dürer "was the first northern artist who fully understood the basic aims of the southern Renaissance", although his style did not always reflect that. The same source says that Hans Holbein the Younger (1497–1543) successfully assimilated Italian ideas while also keeping "northern traditions of close realism". This is contrasted with Dürer's tendency to work in "his own native German style" instead of combining German and Italian styles. Other important artists of the German Renaissance were Matthias Grünewald, Albrecht Altdorfer and Lucas Cranach the Elder.

Artisans such as engravers became more concerned with aesthetics rather than just perfecting their crafts. Germany had master engravers, such as Martin Schongauer, who did metal engravings in the late 1400s. Gardner relates this mastery of the graphic arts to advances in printing which occurred in Germany, and says that metal engraving began to replace the woodcut during the Renaissance. However, some artists, such as Albrecht Dürer, continued to do woodcuts. Both Gardner and Russell describe the fine quality of Dürer's woodcuts, with Russell stating in The World of Dürer that Dürer "elevated them into high works of art".

=== Britain ===
Britain was very late to develop a distinct Renaissance style and most artists of the Tudor court were imported foreigners, usually from the Low Countries, including Hans Holbein the Younger, who died in England. One exception was the portrait miniature, which artists including Nicholas Hilliard developed into a distinct genre well before it became popular in the rest of Europe. Renaissance art in Scotland was similarly dependent on imported artists, and largely restricted to the court.

== Themes and symbolism ==
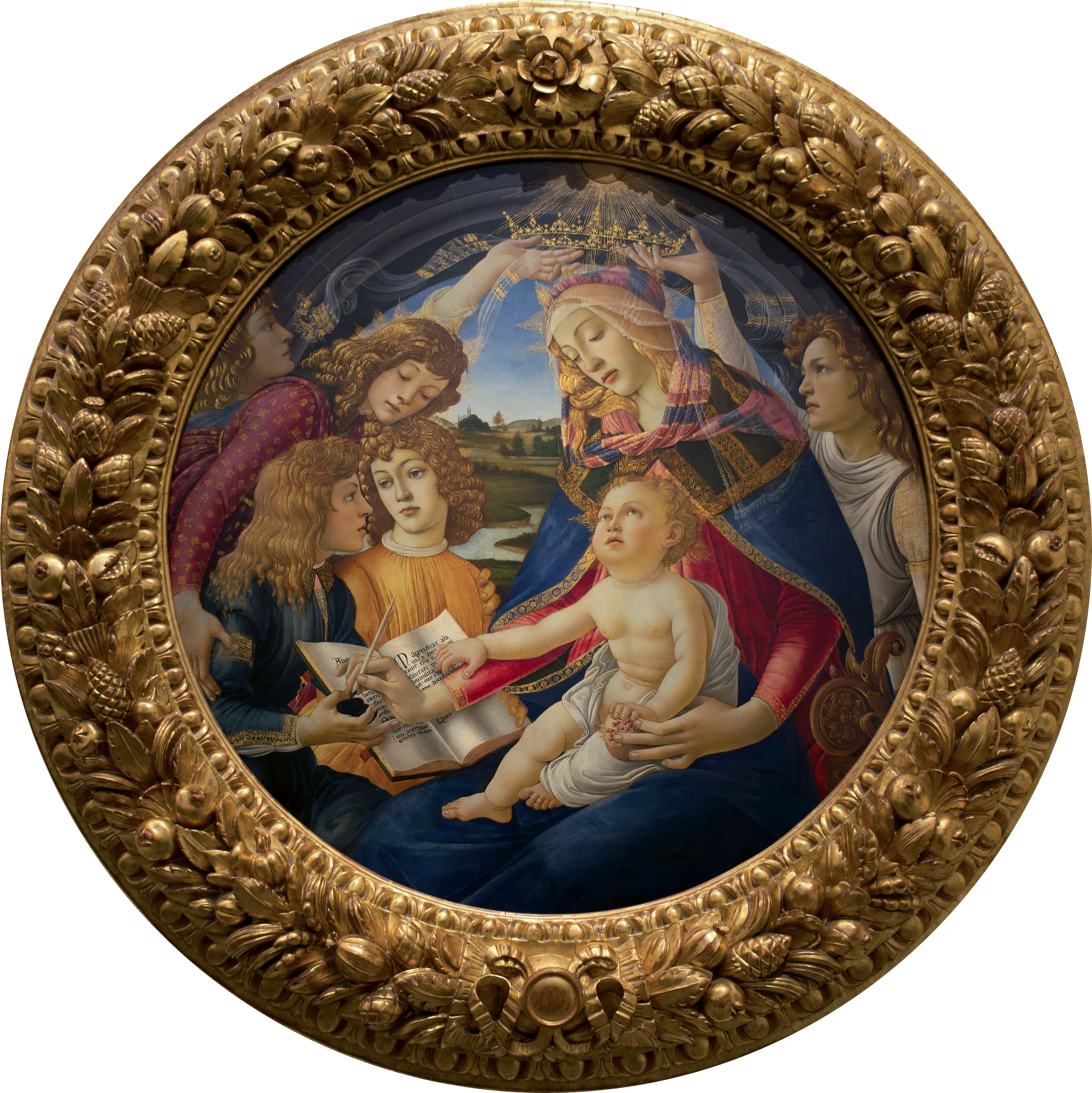
Sandro Botticelli, Magnificat Madonna, 1480–1481, tempera on panel, Uffizi, Florence

Renaissance artists painted a wide variety of themes. Religious altarpieces, fresco cycles, and small works for private devotion were very popular. For inspiration, painters in both Italy and northern Europe frequently turned to Jacobus de Voragine's Golden Legend (1260), a highly influential source book for the lives of saints that had already had a strong influence on Medieval artists. The rebirth of classical antiquity and Renaissance humanism also resulted in many mythological and history paintings. Ovidian stories, for example, were very popular. Decorative ornament, often used in painted architectural elements, was especially influenced by classical Roman motifs.

== Techniques ==
- The use of proportion – The first major treatment of the painting as a window into space appeared in the work of Giotto di Bondone, at the beginning of the 14th century. True linear perspective was formalized later, by Filippo Brunelleschi and Leon Battista Alberti. In addition to giving a more realistic presentation of art, it moved Renaissance painters into composing more paintings.
- Foreshortening – The term foreshortening refers to the artistic effect of shortening lines in a drawing so as to create an illusion of depth.
- Sfumato – The term sfumato was coined by Italian Renaissance artist Leonardo da Vinci and refers to a fine art painting technique of blurring or softening of sharp outlines by subtle and gradual blending of one tone into another through the use of thin glazes to give the illusion of depth or three-dimensionality. This stems from the Italian word sfumare meaning to evaporate or to fade out. The Latin origin is fumare, to smoke.
- Chiaroscuro – The term chiaroscuro refers to the fine art painting modeling effect of using a strong contrast between light and dark to give the illusion of depth or three-dimensionality. This comes from the Italian words meaning light (chiaro) and dark (scuro), a technique which came into wide use in the Baroque period.

== List of Renaissance artists ==
=== Italy ===
- Giotto di Bondone (1267–1337)
- Filippo Brunelleschi (1377–1446)
- Masolino (c. 1383 – c. 1447)
- Donatello (c. 1386 – 1466)
- Pisanello (c. 1395 – c. 1455)
- Fra Angelico (c. 1395 – 1455)
- Paolo Uccello (1397–1475)
- Masaccio (1401–1428)
- Leone Battista Alberti (1404–1472)
- Filippo Lippi (c. 1406 – 1469)
- Domenico Veneziano (c. 1410 – 1461)
- Piero della Francesca (c. 1415 – 1492)
- Andrea del Castagno (c. 1421 – 1457)
- Benozzo Gozzoli (c. 1421 – 1497)
- Alessio Baldovinetti (1425–1499)
- Antonio del Pollaiuolo (1429–1498)
- Antonello da Messina (c. 1430 – 1479)
- Giovanni Bellini (c.1430–1516)
- Andrea Mantegna (c. 1431 – 1506)
- Andrea del Verrocchio (c. 1435 – 1488)
- Giovanni Santi (1435–1494)
- Carlo Crivelli (c. 1435 – c. 1495)
- Donato Bramante (1444–1514)
- Sandro Botticelli (c. 1445 – 1510)
- Luca Signorelli (c. 1445 – 1523)
- Biagio d'Antonio (1446–1516)
- Pietro Perugino (1446–1523)
- Domenico Ghirlandaio (1449–1494)
- Leonardo da Vinci (1452–1519)
- Pinturicchio (1454–1513)
- Filippino Lippi (1457–1504)
- Andrea Solari (c. 1465–1524)
- Piero di Cosimo (1462–1522)
- Vittore Carpaccio (1465–1526)
- Bernardino de' Conti (1465–1525)
- Giorgione (c. 1473–1510)
- Michelangelo (1475–1564)
- Lorenzo Lotto (1480–1557)
- Raphael (1483–1520)
- Marco Cardisco (c. 1486 – c. 1542)
- Titian (c. 1488/1490 – 1576)
- Correggio (c. 1489 – 1534)
- Pietro Negroni (c. 1505 – c. 1565)
- Sofonisba Anguissola (c. 1532 – 1625)

=== Low Countries ===
- Hubert van Eyck (1366?–1426)
- Robert Campin (c. 1380 – 1444)
- Limbourg brothers (fl. 1385–1416)
- Jan van Eyck (1385?–1440?)
- Rogier van der Weyden (1399/1400–1464)
- Jacques Daret (c. 1404 – c. 1470)
- Petrus Christus (1410/1420–1472)
- Dirk Bouts (1415–1475)
- Hugo van der Goes (c. 1430/1440 – 1482)
- Hans Memling (c. 1430 – 1494)
- Hieronymus Bosch (c. 1450 – 1516)
- Gerard David (c. 1455 – 1523)
- Geertgen tot Sint Jans (c. 1465 – c. 1495)
- Quentin Matsys (1466–1530)
- Jean Bellegambe (c. 1470 – 1535)
- Joachim Patinir (c. 1480 – 1524)
- Adriaen Isenbrant (c. 1490 – 1551)

=== Germany ===
- Hans Holbein the Elder (c. 1460 – 1524)
- Matthias Grünewald (c. 1470 – 1528)
- Albrecht Dürer (1471–1528)
- Lucas Cranach the Elder (1472–1553)
- Hans Burgkmair (1473–1531)
- Jerg Ratgeb (c. 1480 – 1526)
- Albrecht Altdorfer (c. 1480 – 1538)
- Leonhard Beck (c. 1480 – 1542)
- Hans Baldung (c. 1480 – 1545)
- Wilhelm Stetter (1487–1552)
- Barthel Bruyn the Elder (1493–1555)
- Ambrosius Holbein (1494–1519)
- Hans Holbein the Younger (c. 1497 – 1543)
- Conrad Faber von Kreuznach (c. 1500 – c. 1553)
- Lucas Cranach the Younger (1515–1586)

=== France ===
- Jean de Beaumetz (c. 1335 – 1396)
- Colart de Laon (c. 1355 – 1417)
- Enguerrand Quarton (c. 1410 – c. 1466)
- Henri Bellechose (fl. before 1415 – before 1445)
- Barthélemy d'Eyck (c. 1420 – after 1470)
- Jean Fouquet (1420 – 1481)
- André d'Ypres (before 1425 – 1450)
- Simon Marmion (c. 1425 – 1489)
- Nicolas Froment (c. 1435 – c. 1486)
- Jean Changenet (? – 1494)
- Jean Poyer (c. 1445 – c. 1503)
- Colin d'Amiens (c. 1450 – c. 1500)
- Jean Perréal (c. 1455 – c. 1530)
- Jean Bourdichon (c. 1456 – c. 1521)
- Gauthier de Campes (fl. 1468 – after 1530) possibly the Master of Saint Giles (c. 1500)
- Jehan Bellegambe (c. 1470 – c. 1536)
- Jean Hey (fl. c. 1475 – c. 1505)
- Jean Clouet (1480 – 1541)
- Josse Lieferinxe (fl. c. 1493 – c. 1508)
- Nicolas Dipre (c. 1495 – 1532)
- Simon de Châlons (c. 1500 – 1568)
- Jean Cousin the Elder (1500 – before 1593)
- François Clouet (c. 1510 – 1572)
- Noël Jallier (? – after 1549)
- Antoine Caron (1521 – 1599)
- Jean Cousin the Younger (c. 1522 – 1595)
- Master of Flora (before 1540 – 1560)
- François Quesnel (c. 1543 – 1619)
- Henri Lerambert (c. 1550 – 1608)
- Jacob Bunel (1558 – 1614)
- Toussaint Dubreuil (c. 1561 – 1602)
- Martin Fréminet (1567 – 1619)
- Philippe Millereau (c. 1570 – 1610)
- Ambroise Dubois (fl. c. 1570 – 1619)
- Quentin Varin (c. 1575 – 1626)
- Georges Lallemand (c. 1575 – 1636)

==== Active in France ====
- Jean Malouel (neth. c. 1365 – 1415)
- Corneille de Lyon (neth. c. 1500 – 1575)
- Francesco Primaticcio (it. 1503 – 1570)
- Grégoire Guérard (neth. before 1512 – after 1538)
- Bartholomeus Pons (neth. before 1518 – after 1541)

=== Portugal ===
- Grão Vasco (1475–1542)
- Gregório Lopes (1490–1550)
- Francisco de Holanda (1517–1585)
- Cristóvão Lopes (1516–1594)
- Cristóvão de Figueiredo (?-c.1543)
- Jorge Afonso (1470–1540)
- António de Holanda (1480–1571)
- Cristóvão de Morais
- Nuno Gonçalves (c. 1425 – c. 1491)
- Francisco Henriques (?–1518)
- Frei Carlos (?–1540)

=== Spain ===
- Jaume Huguet (1412–1492)
- Bartolomé Bermejo (c. 1440 – c. 1501)
- Paolo da San Leocadio (1447 – c. 1520)
- Pedro Berruguete (c. 1450 – 1504)
- Ayne Bru
- Juan de Flandes (c. 1460 – c. 1519)
- Luis de Morales (1512–1586)
- Alonso Sánchez Coello (1531–1588)
- El Greco (1541–1614)
- Juan Pantoja de la Cruz (1553–1608)

=== Venetian Dalmatia ===
- Giorgio da Sebenico (c. 1410 – 1475)
- Niccolò di Giovanni Fiorentino (1418–1506)
- Andrea Alessi (1425–1505)
- Francesco Laurana (c. 1430 – 1502)
- Giovanni Dalmata (c. 1440 – c. 1514)
- Nicholas of Ragusa (1460? – 1517)
- Andrea Schiavone (c. 1510/1515 – 1563)

== Works ==
- Ghent Altarpiece, by Hubert and Jan van Eyck
- The Arnolfini Portrait, by Jan van Eyck
- The Werl Triptych, by Robert Campin
- The Portinari Triptych, by Hugo van der Goes
- The Descent from the Cross, by Rogier van der Weyden
- Flagellation of Christ, by Piero della Francesca
- Spring, by Sandro Botticelli
- Lamentation of Christ, by Mantegna
- The Last Supper, by Leonardo da Vinci
- The School of Athens, by Raphael
- Sistine Chapel ceiling, by Michelangelo
- Equestrian Portrait of Charles V, by Titian
- Isenheim Altarpiece, by Matthias Grünewald
- Melencolia I, by Albrecht Dürer
- The Ambassadors, by Hans Holbein the Younger
- Melun Diptych, by Jean Fouquet
- Saint Vincent Panels, by Nuno Gonçalves
- The Mona Lisa, by Leonardo da Vinci

== Major collections ==
- National Gallery, London, UK
- Museo del Prado, Madrid, Spain
- Uffizi, Florence, Italy
- Louvre, Paris, France
- National Gallery of Art, Washington, USA
- Gemäldegalerie, Berlin, Germany
- Rijksmuseum, Amsterdam
- Metropolitan Museum of Art, New York City, USA
- Royal Museums of Fine Arts of Belgium, Belgium, Brussels
- Groeningemuseum, Bruges, Belgium
- Old St. John's Hospital, Bruges, Belgium
- Bargello, Florence, Italy
- Château d'Écouen (National museum of the Renaissance), Écouen, France
- Vatican Museums, Vatican City
- Pinacoteca di Brera, Milan, Italy

== See also ==
- Danube school
- Forlivese school of art
- Renaissance in Emilia
- History of painting
- I Modi
- Mughal art
- Oriental carpets in Renaissance painting
- Lives of the Most Excellent Painters, Sculptors, and Architects
- The Innocents of Florence
- Leonardo da Vinci's Notebooks
