= Master of the Burgundian Prelates =

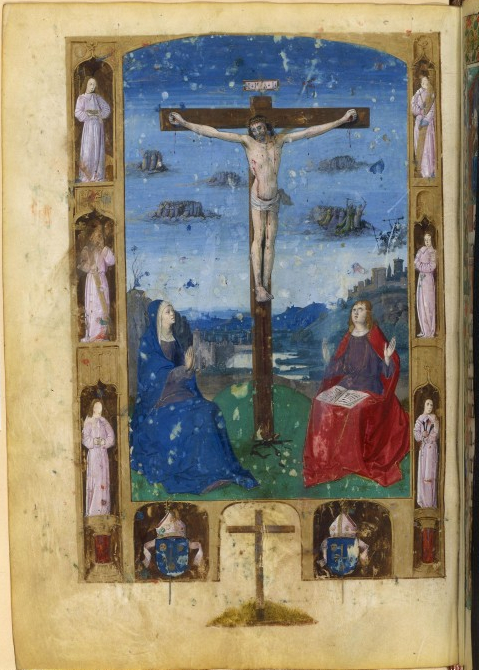
Crucifixion, from the missal of Richard Chambellan; MS BnF Lat.879, f. 105v

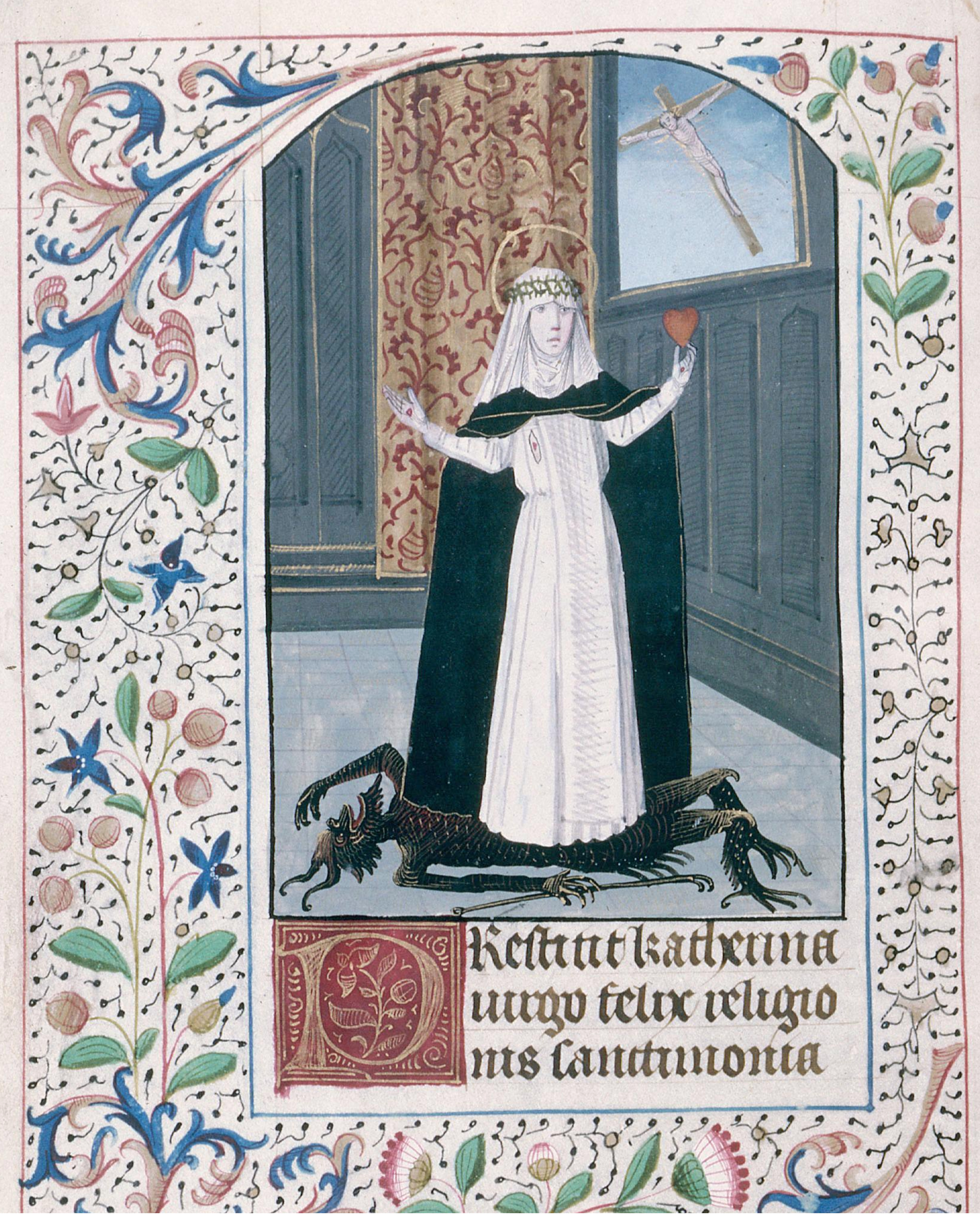
St Catherine of Siena, from the Book of Hours of Philibert Pillot; Autun, Bibliothèque Municipale, MS 269, f. 170v

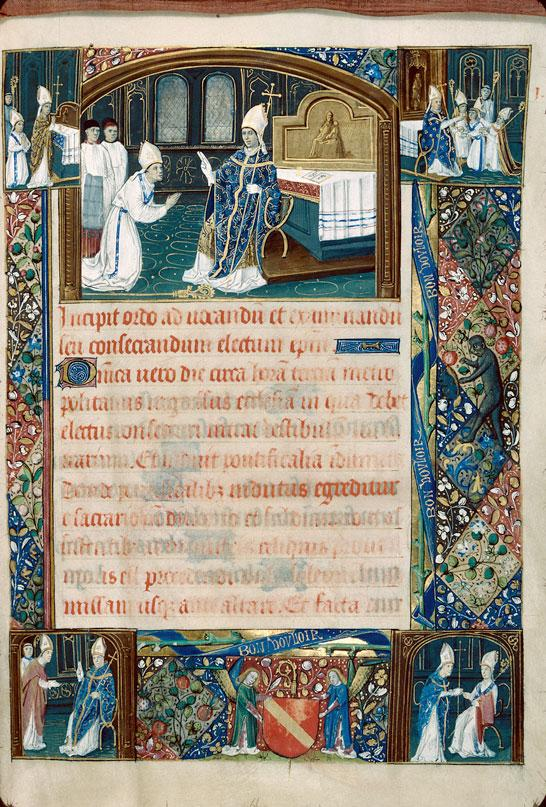
Pontifical of Antoine de Chalon; Autun, Bibliothèque municipale, MS 129, f. 1r

The Master of the Burgundian Prelates was an anonymous master illuminator active in Burgundy between 1470 and 1490. He owes his name to several works commissioned from him by Burgundian bishops and abbots.

== Style ==
The art historian Nicole Reynaud isolated his style from four liturgical manuscripts for which he produced illuminations commissioned by four Burgundian bishops or abbots or of Burgundian origin: a missal for Ferry de Clugny, Bishop of Tournai and canon of Autun, a pontifical for Antoine de Chalon, Bishop of Autun, a breviary for Jean III d'Amboise, Bishop of Langres, and a missal for Richard Chambellan, Abbot of Saint-Étienne de Dijon. These sponsors, as well as the use of location of his books of hours, serve to identify this artist as a Burgundian. He may also have painted murals in the Chapelle Dorée of Autun Cathedral. His style is far removed from the Flemish illumination of the time. His characters are still and rectilinear, his colours dark and often enhanced with gold. His compositions are static and the illuminator has little interest in narrative or drama, but his style is well-adapted to devotional images such as crucifixions.

== Possible identification ==
Several of the painter's motifs are found in the paintings of Josse Lieferinxe, an artist from Hainaut based in Avignon, who is known to have worked in the workshop of Jean Changenet – a Langrois artist from a large family of Burgundian artists – and may have left Burgundy after the death of Charles the Bold in 1477. According to Nicole Reynaud, the Master of the Burgundian Prelates may be a member of Changenet's family, perhaps his brother Pierre, who stayed in Burgundy.

== Works attributed to the Master ==
Fourteen manuscripts were originally attributed to the Master by Nicole Reynaud, and others have been attributed to him since. Among the manuscripts thought to be by him are:

- Pontifical of Antoine de Chalon, Bishop of Autun, c. 1483–1500. Autun, Bibliothèque municipale, MS 129.

- A detached leaf of the above. Autun, Musée Rolin, MS SE 127.

- Book of Hours of Philibert de Pillot, around 1480–1490. Autun, Bibliothèque municipale, MS 269.
- Book of Hours, use of Rome, around 1485 with additions in the years 1520, 8 large and 14 small miniatures. Cambridge, MA, Houghton Library, MS Lat. 249.
- Gospel for the swearing of oaths, of the vicomtes-mayeurs of Dijon, 1488. Dijon, Archives municipales, lay. 5,72 (B 18).
- Book of Hours, use of Langres. Dijon, Bibliothèque municipale, MS 2555.
- The Berbisey Hours, possibly commissioned by Etienne II Berbisey, vicomte-mayeur of Dijon. Dijon, Bibliothèque municipale, MS 3765.
- Book of Hours, use of Rome, two miniatures in the hand of the Master. London, British Library, MS Harley 3181.
- Book of Hours of Louise of Savoy, use of Beaune(?). London, British Library, MS Sloane 2419.
- Tabourot-Bernard Hours, attributed to the Master of the Burgundian Prelates and an assistant, c. 1480–1490. Montreal, McGill University Library, MS 154.
- Book of Hours, use of Rome, around the 1480s. New York, Morgan Library & Museum, MS M 1200.
- Missal of Richard Chambellan, Abbot of Saint-Étienne de Dijon. Paris, Bibliothèque nationale de France MS Lat. 879.
- Breviary, use of Autun, possibly for a member of the Rolin family. San Marino, California, Huntington Library, MS HM 1077.
