= Grégoire Guérard =

16th-century Dutch painter

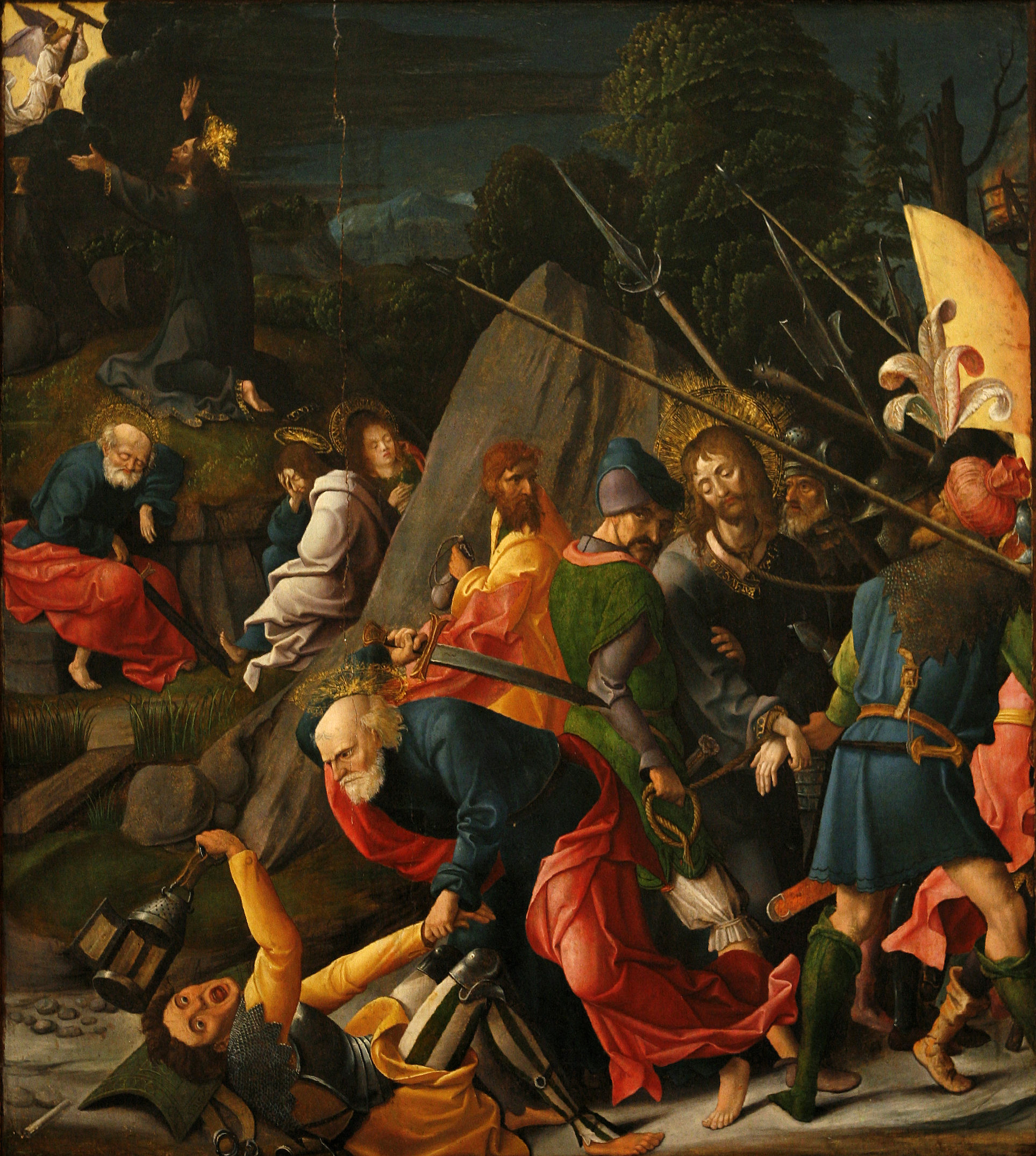
The Arrest of Christ, c. 1520-1522, Dijon, musée des Beaux-Arts

Grégoire Guérard or the Master of the Autun Triptych was a Dutch painter active from 1512 to 1538 at Troyes and in Burgundy and Bresse.

== Life ==
Possibly born in Breda or Utrecht, he was stated to be "from Holland ... a relation of Erasmus of Rotterdam" by the historian Pierre de Saint-Julien de Balleure in his 1581 De l'origine des Bourgongnons. Nothing is known of his youth, but he may have trained among glass painters, for example on the building site of Tournai Cathedral around 1500, in Arnoult of Nijmegen's team.

He is recorded as being in Troyes in 1512, the date at which he painted Penitent Saint Peter for the Madeleine church there, producing a stained glass window of the Tree of Jesse for the same church. The same year he produced a large painting of Christ Bearing the Cross, now divided between the Goya Museum in Castres, the National Renaissance Museum in Écouen, the Musée Rolin in Autun and the Museum of Fine Arts in Algiers. It inspired a print by Israhel Van Meckenem, itself reversing a composition by Martin Schongauer.

Around 1515, he may have planned a stay in Italy, travelling through the Duchy of Burgundy. He stayed at Autun, where he painted his masterpiece, the Eucharist Triptych (musée Rolin), commissioned by Jean Petit-Jean for a chapel dedicated to saints Baudèles, Yves and Privat in Autun Cathedral. It shows his North European training as well as early Italian influences, such as from Fra Bartolomeo's Mystic Marriage of Saint Catherine, which had been offered to Autun Cathedral in 1512 and which he would have seen there.

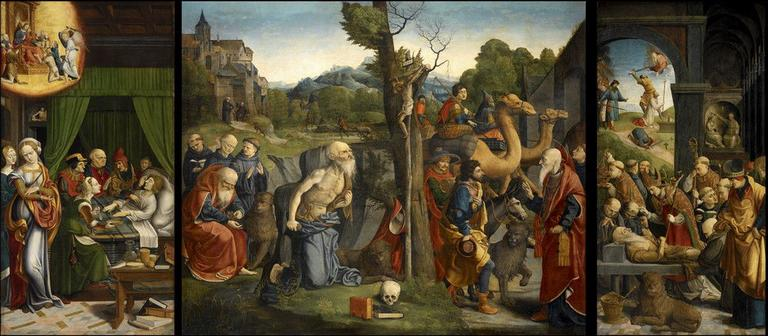
Saint Jerome Triptych, 1518, Bourg-en-Bresse, Musée de Brou.

He probably stayed in Italy around 1515-1518, possibly in Florence and Rome, meeting and befriending fellow Fleming Bartholomeus Pons. The stay profoundly influenced his style. On returning from Rome he settled in Tournus, where he was recorded in 1518 - the register of the painters' guild in Haarlem shows that Pons was lodging "in Tornis in the house [of] master Guerad".

== Bibliography (in French) ==
- Pierre de Saint-Julien de Balleure (1581). De l'origine des Bourgongnons, et Antiquité des Estats de Bourgongne (in French). Paris: Nicolas Chesneau.
- Frédéric Elsig, Grégoire Guérard, Milan, Silvana Editoriale, 2017.
- Matthieu Gilles, « Trois nouveaux panneaux de Grégoire Guérard », in Frédéric Elsig (ed.), Peindre à Dijon au XVIe siecle, Milan, Silvana Editoriale, coll. Biblioteca d’arte, 54, 2016, p. 193-203.
- Cécile Scailliérez, « Le Christ portant sa croix acquis par le Louvre : complément à la carrière troyenne de Grégoire Guérard », in Frédéric Elsig (ed.), Peindre à Troyes au XVIe siecle, Milan, Silvana Editoriale (coll. Biblioteca d'arte), 2015, p. 127-129.
- Frédéric Elsig, « La carrière troyenne de Grégoire Guérard », in Frédéric Elsig (ed.), Peindre à Troyes au XVIe siecle, Milan, Silvana Editoriale (coll. Biblioteca d'arte), 2015, p. 115-125.
- Frédéric Elsig, « Grégoire Guérard et la peinture à Troyes », in Frédéric Elsig (ed.), Peindre en France à la Renaissance, I. Les courants stylistiques au temps de Louis XII et de François Ier. Cinisello Balsamo, 2011, p. 129-135.
- Frédéric Elsig, « Le présumé Grégoire Guérard et la peinture en Bresse au temps de Marguerite d'Autriche », in Caecilia Pieri (ed.), Brou, un monument européen à l'aube de la Renaissance, actes du colloque scientifique international de Brou, 13-14 octobre 2006, Paris, éd. du Patrimoine, 2009, p. 149-160.
- Elsig, Frédéric (2005). "Un peintre de la Renaissance en Bourgogne : le Maître du triptyque d'Autun (Grégoire Guérard ?)". Revue de l’Art (in French).
- Frédéric Elsig, « La peinture en Savoie et en Franche-Comté durant la première moitié du XVIe siecle », in Mauro Natale, Frédéric Elsig (ed.), La Renaissance en Savoie. Les arts au temps du duc Charles II (1504 – 1553), catalogue d'exposition, Genève, Musée d’art et d’histoire, 15 mars – 25 août 2002, p.77-94.
- Frédéric Elsig, « Catherine Chédeau, Les Arts à Dijon au XVIe siecle : les débuts de la Renaissance 1494-1551 », compte-rendu, in Bibliothèque d’Humanisme et Renaissance, 2000, t. LXII, p. 744-745.
- Gabriel Jeanton, « Grégoire Guérard », in Réunion de la Société des beaux-arts des départements, XXXVII, 1913.
- Gabriel Jeanton, « Le triptyque de Cuisery attribué à Grégoire Guérard », in Réunion des Sociétés des beaux-arts des départements, XXXVI, Paris, 1912, p.10-16, in Bulletin de la Société des amis des arts de la Bresse louhannaise, n° 5, 1913, p. 37-43.
