= Juan de Nalda =

Spanish painter (fl. 1490–1510)

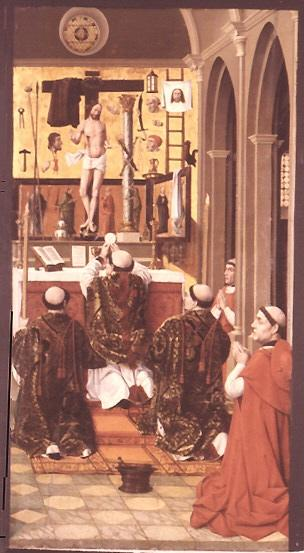
Mass of Saint Gregory, oil on panel, 157 x 78 cm, Madrid, National Archaeological Museum.

Juan de Nalda (fl. 1490–1510) was a Spanish painter in the Flemish style.

He was the son of an embroiderer active in Navarrete in La Rioja. In November 1493 documents record him in the studio of Jean Changenet, an Avignon-based French painter, who died late in 1494 or early in 1495. De Nalda's style shows heavy influence from the Avignon School of Provencal art, with its clear colours and simple volumes producing a calm atmosphere and composition.

Charles Sterling argues de Nalda was the painter of the high altarpiece at the monastic church in Santa Clara in Palencia, previously attributed to the 'Master of Santa Clara in Palencia' or 'Master of Santa María del Campo' - two of its panels survive at Spain's National Archaeological Museum in Madrid (Our Lady of Pity (Note: With portraits of Isabella of Portugal and John II of Castile, perhaps making the commissioner Isabella's daughter Isabella I of Castile) and The Mass of Saint Gregory), whilst others are now in the Museum of Fine Arts in Lyon (Death of the Virgin and Coronation of the Virgin). It seems to have been commissioned by María de Velasco, widow of admiral Alfonso Enríquez - the monastery was under her patronage and so the painting must have been completed before 1505, when Maria made her will. Patricia Andrés González makes several objections to the altarpiece being de Nalda's work, based exclusively on supposed Provençal influences.

Pilar Silva Maroto later attributed the Saint John the Baptist from the Visitation Altarpiece in Palencia Cathedral to de Nalda and the anonymous 'Master of the Visitation' on stylistic grounds as a commission from canon Juan de Ayllón, He also attributed a Saint Gregory of unknown provenance (in the Prado since 1926) to de Nalda.

== Bibliography ==
- (in Spanish) Azcarate, José María, Arte gótico en España, Madrid, Cátedra, 2000, ISBN 84-376-0894-5, p. 393.
