= Château de Balleure =

Castle in Bourgogne-Franche-Comté, France

Coordinates: 46°34′42″N 4°48′03″E

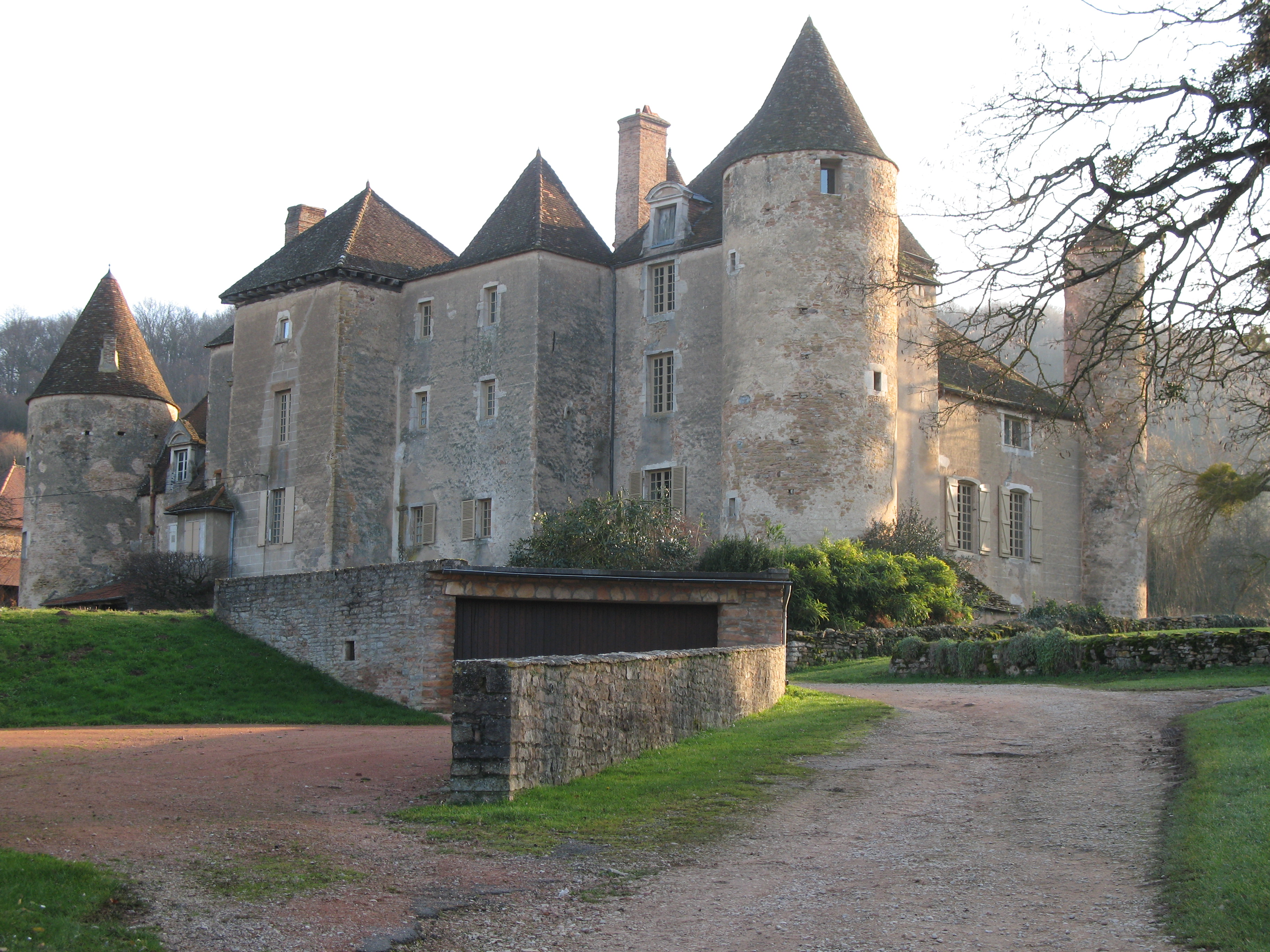
Château de Balleure

The Château de Balleure is a castle in the commune of Étrigny in the Saône-et-Loire département of France.

== Description ==
The castle has a rectangular plan confined by circular towers. To the east is a rectangular residential building; to the north a gatehouse tower, a large square tower and a second square tower of lesser dimensions; to the west a high residential building flanked by a staircase tower.

== History ==
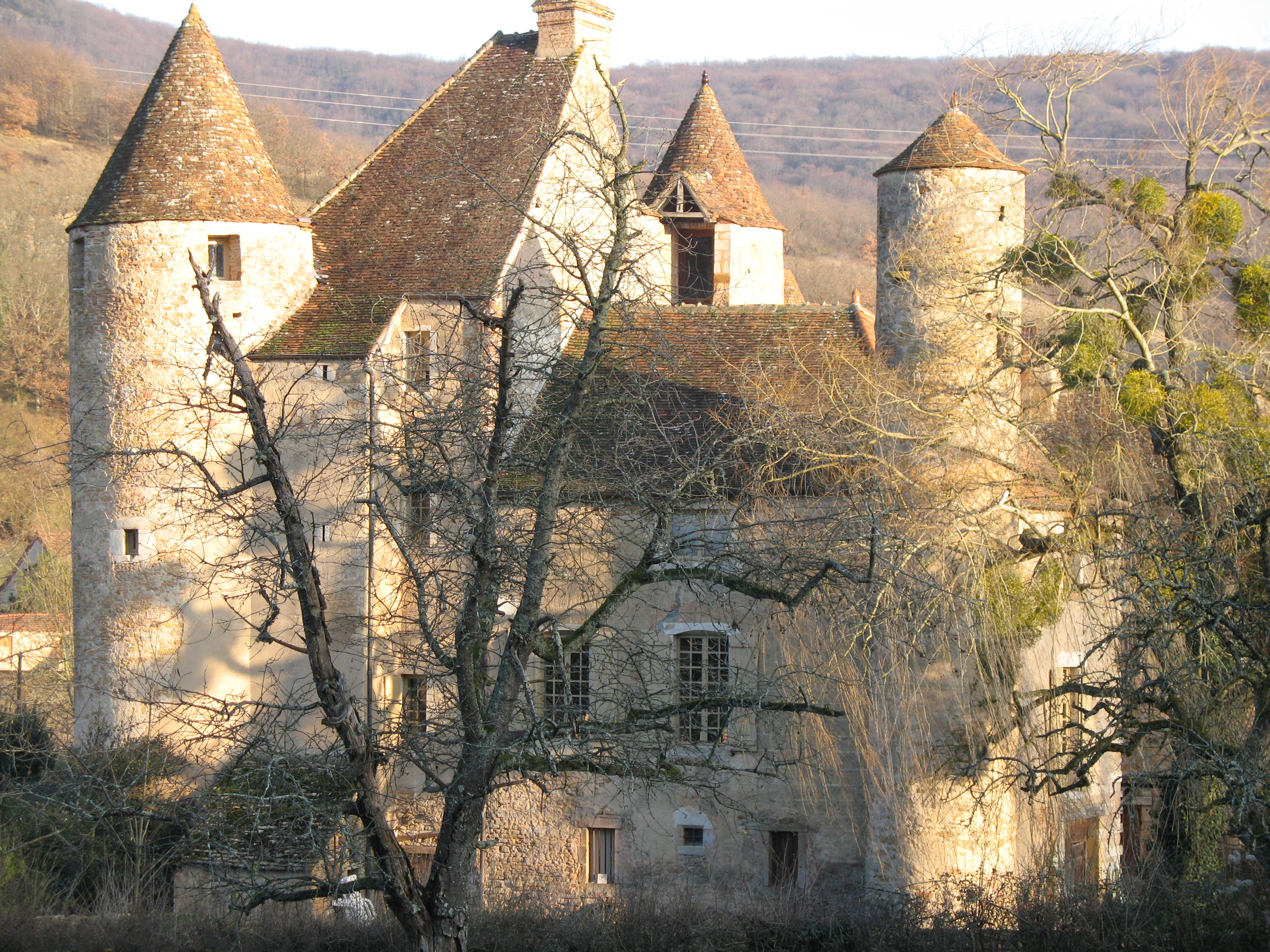
Château de Balleure

In the middle of the 13th century : the land belonged to the Sauvement family. In 1340, Henri de Sauvement obtained authorisation from the Duke of Burgundy to surround his house with walls and moats. In the 14th century, the castle passed into the possession of Rabutin d'Epiry and at the beginning of 15th century to the house of Saint-Julien. The historian, Pierre de Saint-Julien de Balleure, was born in the castle in 1519. In 1613, it passed to Charles de Naturel and stayed in his family until the French Revolution. In 1767, François-Emmanuel de Naturel undertook a partial restoration. During the 19th century, the property was shared among several owners.

== Monument ==
The castle is private property and not open to visitors. It was added to the supplementary inventory of monuments historiques by the French Ministry of Culture in December 1941.

== See also ==
- List of castles in France
