= Pierre de Saint-Julien de Balleure =

French historian

Saint-Julien coat of arms.

Pierre de Saint-Julien de Balleure (1519–1593) was a historian of the Renaissance period from the Province of Burgundy.

Born in 1519 at the Château de Balleure (Étrigny), this erudite provincial notably wrote a history of the Burgundians, published while he was Dean of Chalon-sur-Saône. De l’origine des Bourgongnons, et antiquité des estats de Bourgongne was printed in 1581 in Paris, "chez Nicolas Chesneau, ruë Sainct Jacques, au Chesne Verd" (chez Nicolas Chesneau, Rue Saint Jacques, at the [sign of the] green oak).

His tombstone may be seen in the church of Saint-Vincent in Chalon-sur-Saône.

== General references ==
- Raffin, Léonce Saint-Julien de Balleure, historien bourguignon, Paris, Champion, 1926.
