= Jean Changenet =

French painter (late 15th-century)

Jean Changenet or Jean II Changenet was a late 15th century French painter active in Dijon and Avignon.

== Life ==
He was probably the son of Jean I Changenet and brother of Pierre Changenet, both also painters active in Dijon. Modern studies tentatively identify him with the third Master of the Burgundian Prelates.

He is recorded as being in Avignon from 1485 until his death early in 1495. With his wife Antoinette Henri he had two children, Michèle and Delphine, the former of which married Josse Lieferinxe in 1503.

His many commissions in only a dozen years confirm his reputation as the most important painter active in Avignon between the generation of Nicolas Froment and that of Nicolas Dipre. He set up his studio there early in the 1480s on rue de la Miraillerie. In 1492 he was one of two masters of the painters' confraternity of Saint Luke in the city. In 1493, he welcomed his "Spanish companion" Juan de Nalda and trained him for three years.

== Works ==
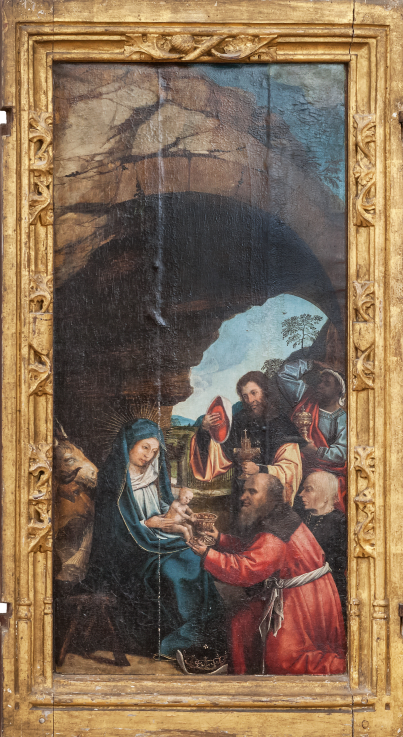
Changenet, Adoration of the Magi, 1490-1495 (Gretz-Armainvilliers, église Saint Jean-Baptiste).

=== Gretz-Armainvilliers triptych ===
The église Saint-Jean-Baptiste in Gretz-Armainvilliers houses a triptych showing Adoration of the Magi (with Saint Nicholas on the reverse), Flight into Egypt, and Assumption (with Saint Bénigne on the reverse). In 2016, Carmen Decu Teodorescu and Frédéric Elsig identified the panels of this triptych with three of the four panels of the high altarpiece at the Church of Notre-Dame of Dijon, the latter having the subject of a 1490 contract between Changenet and Nicolas Bouesseau, president of the Chambre des comptes de Dijon. If the reverses of these wings were complete at the time of the painter's death in 1495, the fronts were completed by Jean Grassi between 1499 and 1500 - Grassi was then renting Changenet's former house.

This attribution is still debated. According to Elsig and Teodorescu, such an attribution would allow all works previously attributed to Lieferinxe to be reattributed to Changenet. Conversely but on the same grounds, Elliot Adam and Sophie Caron confirm the three panels' attribution to Changenet, following theories already mooted by Charles Sterling in 1973 and Michel Laclotte in 1975.

=== Other ===
- Three Prophets, 1484 (?), musée du Louvre, Paris - a fragment from the high altarpiece of the Dominican church in Arles, which Pierre Véran states to have shown the Tree of Jesse and borne the signature of the painter Jean de Bourgogne and the date of 1 May 1484
- Saint Peter, private collection, New York.
- Mater Dolorosa, or Madonna Addolorata, Galleria Nazionale d'Arte Antica, Rome

== Bibliography (in French) ==
- Charles Sterling, « Pour Jean Changenet et Juan de Nalda », L'Oeil, 217-218, 1973, p. 4-19.
- Michel Laclotte, « À propos de quelques primitifs méditerranéens », inÉtudes d'art français offertes à Charles Sterling, Paris, 1975, p. 145-150.
- Michel Laclotte and Dominique Thiébaut, L'École d'Avignon, Flammarion, Paris, 1983, 301 p. ISBN 978-2080120168
- Frédéric Elsig (ed.), Peindre à Dijon au XVIe siècle, Silvana Editoriale, Milan, 2016, 296 p. ISBN 978-2-08-012016-8
- Sophie Caron, « Une nouvelle Assomption pour le Louvre : entre Jean Changenet et Josse Lieferinxe », La Revue des musées de France. Revue du Louvre, 3, 2019, p. 24-37.
- Frédéric Elsig (ed.), Peindre à Avignon au XVe-XVIe siècles, Silvana Editoriale, Milan, 2020, 264 p. ISBN 978-8836642984
- Elliot Adam and Sophie Caron, La Maison Changenet. Une famille de peintres entre Provence et Bourgogne vers 1500, ouvrage accompagnant l'exposition présentée au musée du Louvre, Éditions du Musée du Louvre / In Fine Editions d’art, Paris, 2021, 180 p. ISBN 978-2902302895
- Carmen Decu Teodorescu and Frédéric Elsig, Les Changenet, Silvana Editoriale, Milan, 2021, 220 p. ISBN 978-8836644148
- Sophie Caron, « Un atelier dijonnais et ses filiales en Provence : la « maison » Changenet », in Miroir du Prince. La commande artistique des hauts fonctionnaires à la cour de Bourgogne, 1425-1510, cat. exp., Gand, Snoeck, 2021, p. 218-226. ISBN 978-94-6161-613-5
