= Eucharist Triptych =

Altarpiece by Grégoire Guérard

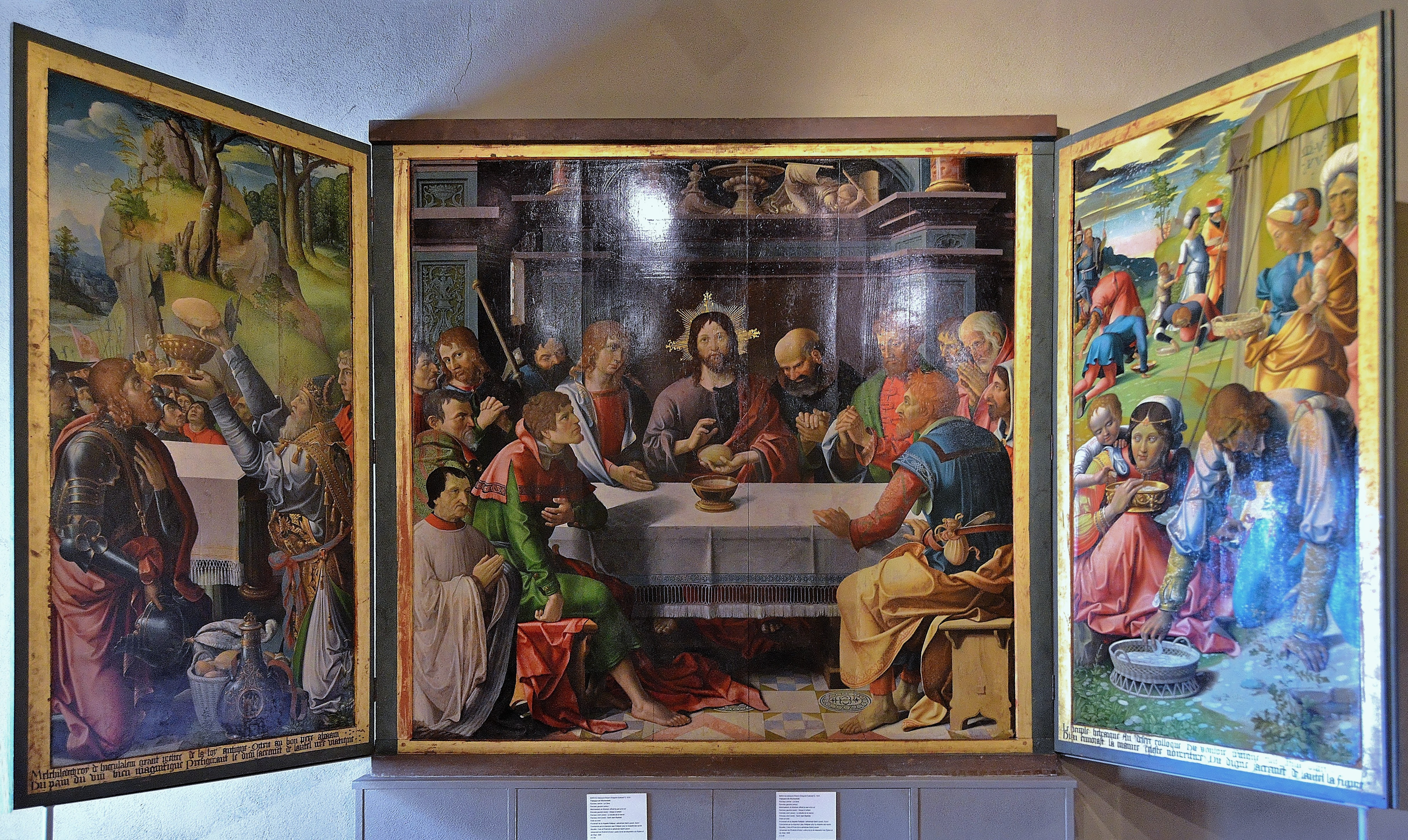
Eucharist Triptych (1515) by Grégoire Guérard

The Eucharist Triptych is an oil on panel painting by Grégoire Guérard, from 1515, commissioned for Autun Cathedral. The central panel shows the Last Supper, with the wings showing Abram meeting Melchizedek and the fall of the manna. On the reverse of the wings are grisaille images of the Madonna and Child and of John the Baptist. It was made a monument historique on 1 June 1907 and is now in the Musée Rolin, also in Autun.
