= Josse Lieferinxe =

French painter

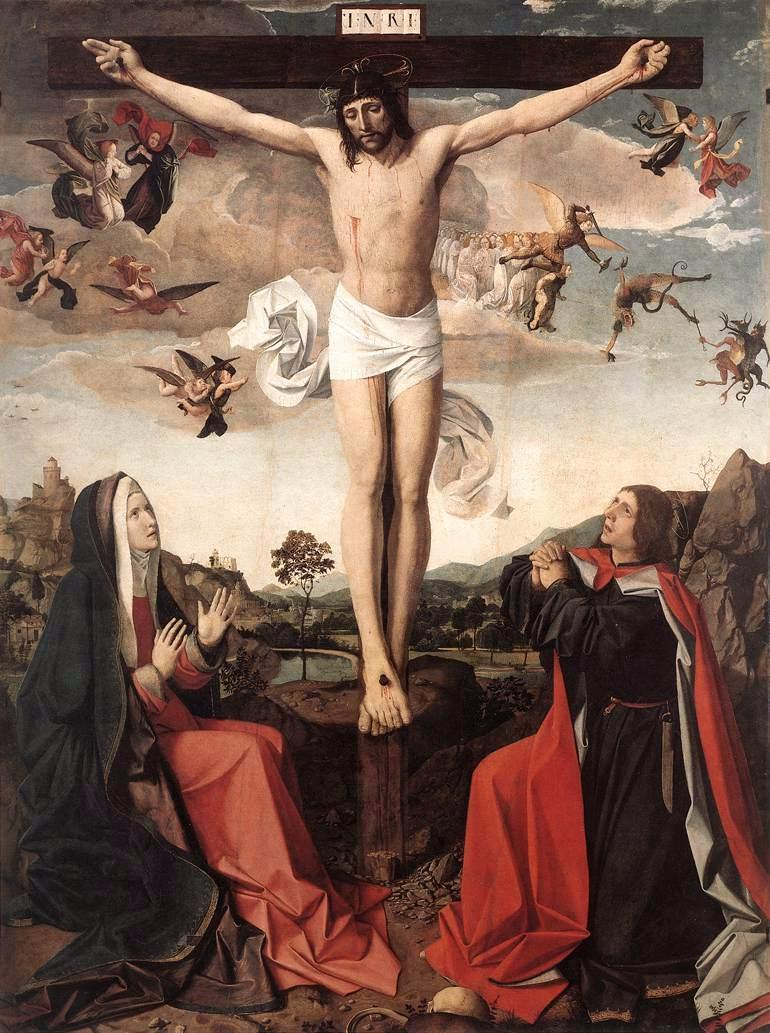
- Calvary, by Josse Lieferinxe, c. 1500 (Louvre)
- Born: Cambrai, Hainaut, South Netherland
- Died: c. 1503-1508
- Other name: Master of St. Sebastian
- Occupation: Painter
- Spouse: Michelle Changenet (m. 1503)

Josse Lieferinxe (fl. c. 1493–1503/08) was a South Netherlandish painter, formerly known by the pseudonym the Master of St. Sebastian.

Originating in the diocese of Cambrai in Hainaut, then part of the territories ruled by the Dukes of Burgundy, Josse Lieferinxe was documented as a "Picard" in the regions of Avignon and Marseille at the end of the fifteenth and in the early sixteenth centuries. He was first mentioned in Provence in 1493. Thus he figures among the painters of the Provençal school, whose most prominent members in an earlier generation had also been from the far north of the French-speaking world—Barthélemy d'Eyck and Enguerrand Quarton. In 1503 he married Michelle, a daughter of Jean Changenet, the most prominent painter of Avignon, in whose atelier Lieferinxe may have matured his style. He was last mentioned living in 1505, and in 1508 as deceased.

Before he was identified by Charles Sterling who linked his work with a document, his artistic personality was recognized, as the "Master of St. Sebastian", through a former retable of eight scenes depicting the acts and miracles of Saint Sebastian and Saint Roch, protectors against the plague, which was commissioned in 1497 for the church of Nôtre Dame des Accoulés in Marseille. Bernardino Sismondi, who originally received the commission, died, however, before he could finish the work. By the early twentieth century the panels had become widely dispersed in museums (see below). Panels from a Life of the Virgin were also identified with the anonymous Sebastian master: two panels painted on both sides in the Musée Calvet, Avignon—a Circumcision backed by a Saint Catherine and an Annunciation backed by Saint Michael Killing the Dragon—and another, a Marriage of the Virgin in the Royal Museums of Fine Arts of Belgium, Brussels; a fragmentary third panel, also painted on both sides, is in the Musée du Louvre.

== Selected works ==
A more complete list can be found in the database of the Centre for the Study of Fifteenth-Century Painting

- Life and Miracles of Saint Sebastian, 1497.
  - Saint Sebastian before Diocletian, 1497 (Hermitage Museum).
  - Saint Sebastian Destroying Pagan Idols, 1497 (Philadelphia Museum of Art).
  - Martyrdom of Saint Sebastian Saint Sebastian Tended by Saint Irene, 1497, and another panel (Philadelphia Museum of Art). (On-line illustrations).
  - Saint Sebastian intercedes for the plague-stricken, 1497 (Walters Art Museum, Baltimore).
  - Pilgrims at the Tomb of St Sebastian (Galleria Nazionale d'Arte Antica, Rome.
- The Archangel Michael Killing the Dragon (Musée du Petit Palais, Avignon).
- Abraham Visited by Three Angels, dated 1500 (Kress Collection, Denver Art Museum.
- Calvary (Louvre) (illustration, above)
- Retable. Scattered wing panels and other elements. (Musée du Louvre; Royal Museum of Fine Arts, Brussels; Musée Calvet, Avignon).
  - Adoration of the Infant Jesus, on the reverse of the panel A Bishop Saint (Louvre)
  - Visitation, on the reverse of the panel, Saint Lucy (Louvre)
  - Assumption of Mary, on the reverse of the panel, Saint Ivo (Louvre)
- Ecce Homo (Biblioteca Ambrosiana). (Catalogue entry)
- Pietà (Antwerp)
