= Bartholomeus Pons =

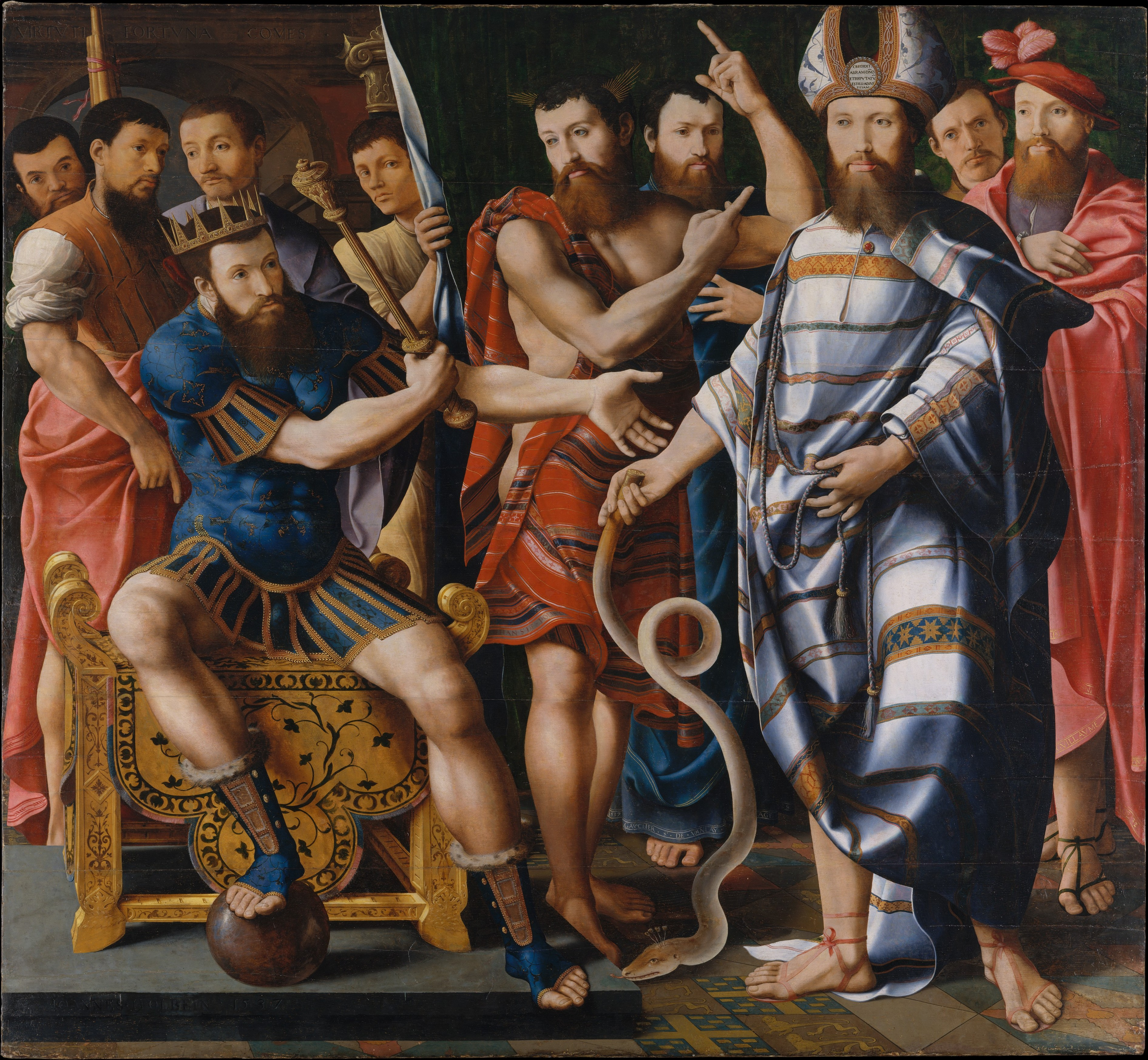
Moses and Aaron before Pharaoh, 1537, New York, The Metropolitan Museum of Art

Bartholomeus Pons (also known as Félix Chrétien, Pseudo Félix Chrétien or the Master of Dinteville) was a painter born in Haarlem, active from 1518 to 1541 in Burgundy and Champagne.

== List of works ==
- Triptych of Saint Eugenia, 1535, Varzy, église Saint-Pierre-ès-Liens
- Processional banners : Saint Stephen and Saint Amator and Saint Germanus and the Madonna and Child, 1536, Paris, musée des Arts décoratifs
- The Dinteville Brothers and Moses and Aaron before Pharaoh, 1537, New-York, The Metropolitan Museum of Art
- Portrait of Jean de Langeac, 1539, New.York, The Metropolitan Museum of Art
- Joseph's Dream and Jesus Among the Doctors, grisaille, 1541, Troyes, musée de Vauluisant
- Portrait of a Man, Paris, musée du Louvre

=== Attributed ===
- Descent into the Cave, 1537, Francfort, Städel Museum
- Scene from the Life of Saint Severus, private collection
- Stained glass at Saint-Julien-du-Sault and Chatillon-sur-Seine

== Bibliography (in French) ==
- Camille Larraz, « Le portrait de Jean de Langeac, évêque de Limoges : une œuvre du Maître de Dinteville ? », Bibliothèque d'Humanisme et Renaissance, t.LXXIX, no. 3, 2017, p. 619-624.
- Frédéric Elsig, « Le Maître de Dinteville et le vitrail », dans Frédéric Elsig (ed.), Peindre à Dijon au XVI siecle, Milan, Silvana Editoriale, coll. Biblioteca d’arte, 54, 2016, p.205-213.
- Cécile Scailliérez, « Un peintre haarlémois à Troyes : Bartholomeus Pons », dans Elsig, Frédéric (ed.), Peindre à Troyes au XVI siecle, Milan, Silvana Editoriale (coll. Biblioteca d'arte), 2015, p.131-143.
- Stéphanie Deprouw-Augustin, « Deux œuvres inédites du Maître de Dinteville (Bartholomeus Pons ?) : les bannières des Arts décoratifs », dans Elsig, Frédéric (ed.), Peindre en France à la Renaissance. I, Les courants stylistiques au temps de Louis XII et de François Ier, Milan, Silvana Editoriale (coll. Biblioteca d'arte), 2011, p. 137-145.
- Elizabeth A.R. Brown, « The Dinteville Family and the Allegory of Moses and Aaron before Pharaoh », dans Metropolitan Museum Journal, 34, 1999, p.73-100.
- Josua Bruyn, « Over de betekenis van het werk van Jan van Scorel omstreeks 1530 voor oudere en jongere tijdgenoten, IV. De Pseudo-Félix Chrétien : een Haarlemse schilder (Bartholomeus Pons ?) bij de bisschop van Auxerre », dans Oud Holland, 98, 1984, p.98-110.
- Andrée Jouan, « École Hollandaise, Pseudo Félix Chrestien. Retable de sainte Eugénie, panneau central, Église de Varzy », dans Bulletin du Laboratoire du Musée du Louvre, 10, 1965, p.60-63.
- Jacques Thuillier, « Études sur le cercle des Dinteville. I. L’énigme de Félix Chrestien », dans Art de France, I, 1961, p.55-75.
- Mary F. S. Hervey et Robert Martin-Holland, « A forgotten French painter : Felix Chretien », dans The Burlington Magazine, XIX, 1911, p.48-55.
