= Étrigny =

- Commune
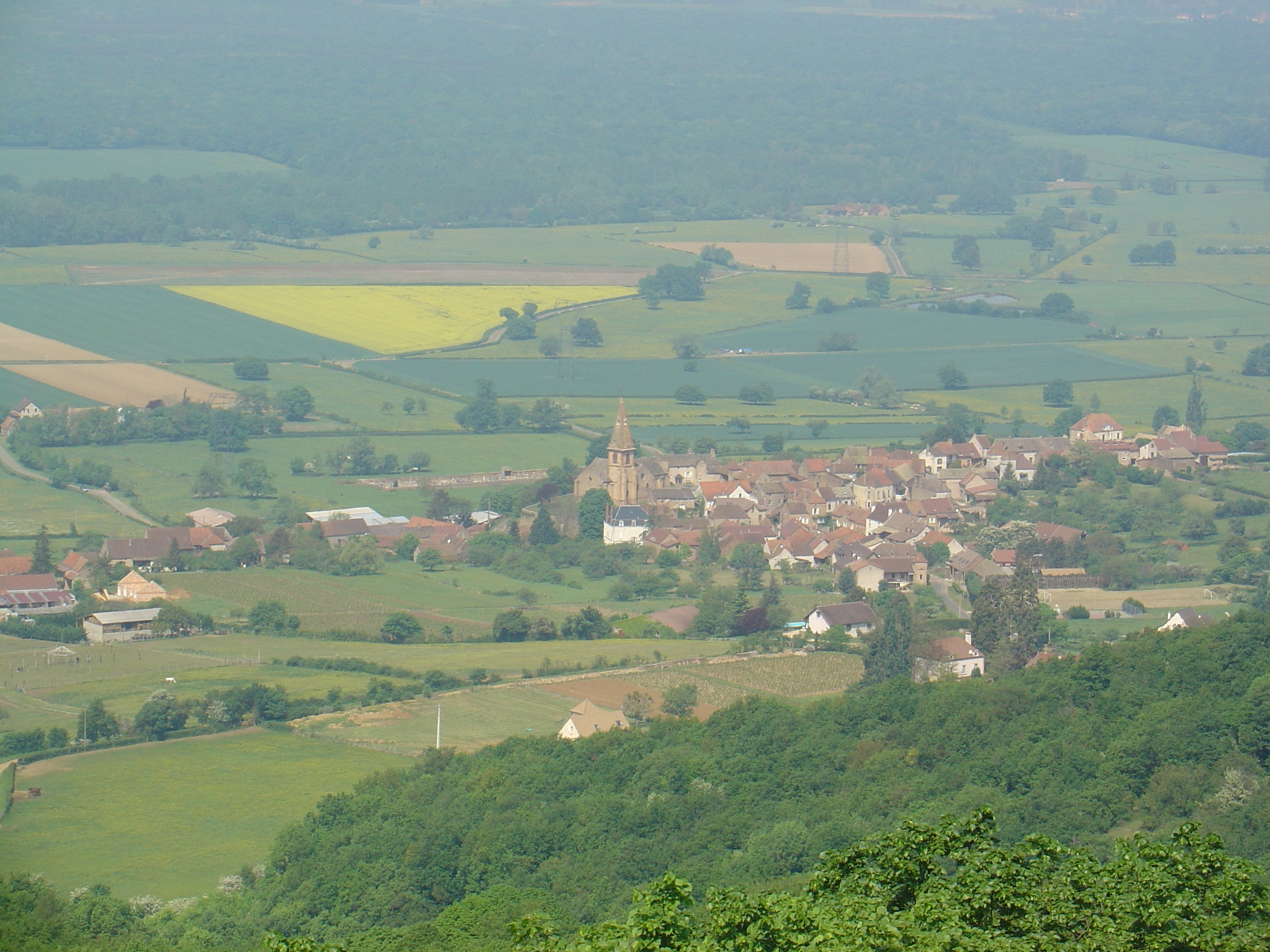
- A general view of Étrigny
- Location of Étrigny
- Location within France Location within Bourgogne-Franche-Comté
- Coordinates: 46°35′28″N 4°48′16″E
- Country: France
- Region: Bourgogne-Franche-Comté
- Department: Saône-et-Loire
- Arrondissement: Chalon-sur-Saône
- Canton: Tournus
- Intercommunality: entre Saône et Grosne

Government
  - Mayor (2020–2026): Jean-Paul Guerriaud
- Area^{1}: 19.22 km^{2} (7.42 sq mi)
- Elevation: 280 m (920 ft)
- Highest elevation: 500 m (1,600 ft)
- Lowest elevation: 189 m (620 ft)
- Population (2023): 482
  - Density: 25.1/km^{2} (65.0/sq mi)
- Time zone: UTC+01:00 (CET)
  - Summer (DST): UTC+02:00 (CEST)
- INSEE/Postal code: 71193 /71240
- ^{1} French Land Register data, which excludes lakes, ponds, glaciers > 1 km^{2} (0.386 sq mi or 247 acres) and river estuaries.

Étrigny (French pronunciation: [etʁiɲi]) is a commune in the eastern French department of Saône-et-Loire. In 1971 it absorbed the former commune Champlieu.

It is about 20 km (12 mi) south of Chalon-sur-Saône and 100 km (62 mi) north of Lyon.

== Population ==
Population data refer to the area corresponding with the commune as of January 2025.

Historical population
Year	Pop.	±% p.a.
1968	441	—
1975	371	−2.44%
1982	355	−0.63%
1990	352	−0.11%
1999	395	+1.29%
2007	436	+1.24%
2012	456	+0.90%
2017	474	+0.78%
2023	482	+0.28%
Source: INSEE

== See also ==
- Communes of the Saône-et-Loire department
