= Charles Sterling =

Polish art historian

- Born: Karol Sterling; September 5, 1901; Warsaw, Congress Poland, Russian Empire
- Died: January 9, 1991 (aged 89); Paris, France
- Occupations: Art historian, essayist

Charles Sterling (born Karol Sterling; 5 September 1901, Warsaw, Congress Poland, Russian Empire – 9 January 1991, Paris, France) was a Polish art historian mainly active in France.

He fought in the Polish–Soviet War in defence of newly gained Polish independence and was decorated several times. He then graduated in law in 1924 before turning to art history in Germany, Great Britain and finally in Paris from 1925 to 1928, under the direction of Gaston Brière at the École du Louvre and at the same time on Henri Focillon's course at the Sorbonne. He specialised in the French 'primitives' (notably the Moulins Master) and the Caravaggisti. From 1929 to 1961 he was curator of the department of paintings at the Louvre.
