= Jully =

Jully may refer to:

== People ==
- Ange Laurent Lalive de Jully (1725–1779), French financier and patron of arts
- Humbeline of Jully (1091–1136), French nun
- Jully Black (born 1977), Canadian singer-songwriter, producer and actress
- Jully Luciano da Silva (born 1999), Brazilian footballer
- Jully Makini (born 1953), Solomon Islands poet, writer and women's rights activist
- Princess Jully, Kenyan musician

== Places ==
- Château de Jully, France
- Jully, Yonne, France
- Jully-lès-Buxy, Saône-et-Loire, France
- Jully-sur-Sarce, Aube, France

== See also ==
- Julie (given name)
