= Humbeline of Jully =

Benedictine nun

Blessed Humbeline
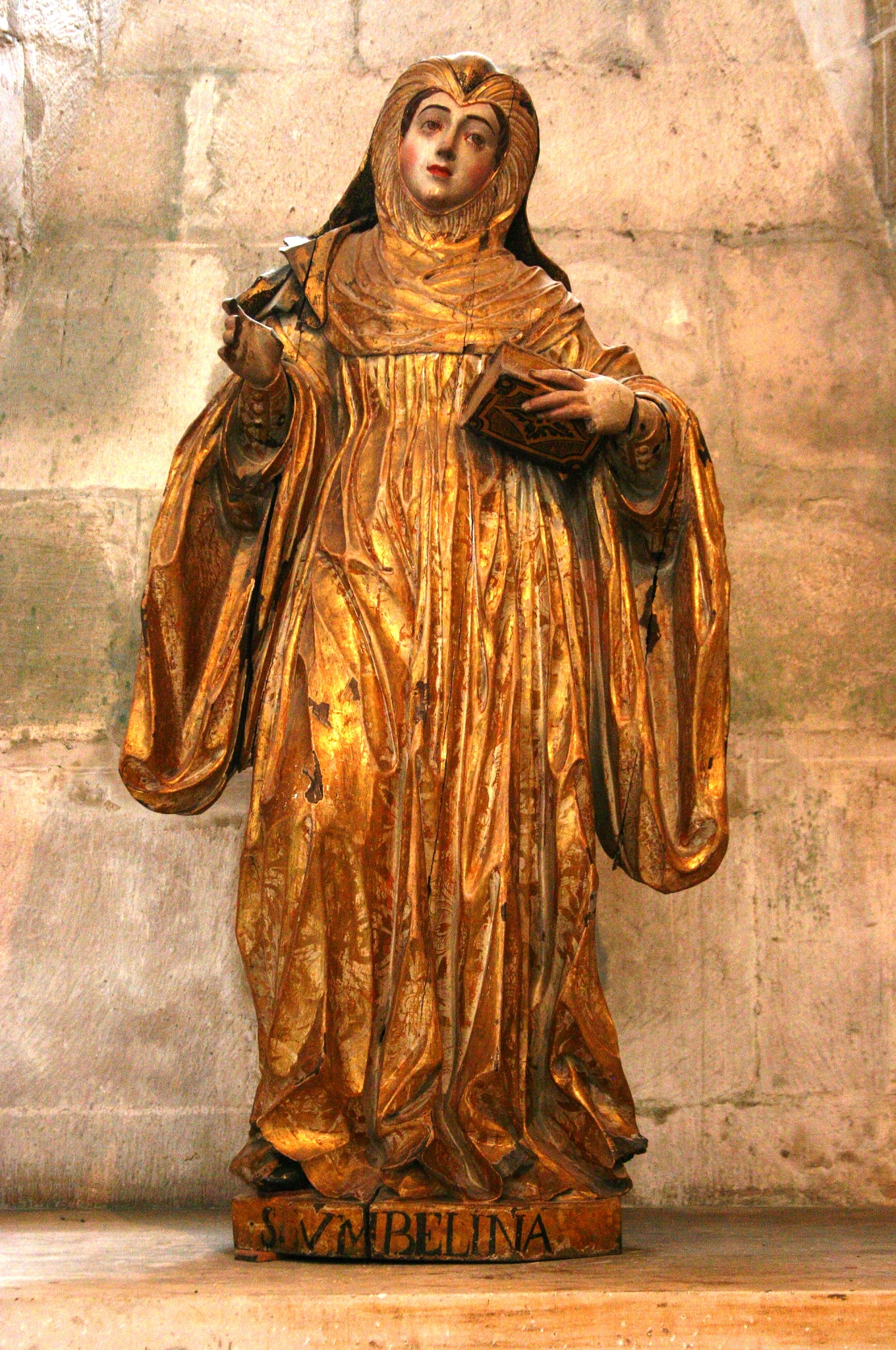
- Blessed Humbeline, Portugal, 17th century

Prioress
- Born: c. 1091 near Dijon, France
- Died: c. 1136; Jully, Yonne, France
- Venerated in: Roman Catholic Church
- Beatified: 1703 by Pope Clement XI
- Feast: August 21 (formerly February 12)
- Patronage: Cistercian nuns
- Tradition or genre: Benedictine

Humbeline of Jully (c. 1091 – c. 1136) was a Benedictine nun in 11th-12th century France, who was beatified in the Roman Catholic Church in 1703 by Pope Clement XI.

After obtaining permission from her then-husband, Humbeline entered the community of nuns at Jully in 1133, when a charter records the tithes she contributed. She later became prioress at Jully.

Humbeline was born to Tescelin de Fontaine, lord of Fontaine-lès-Dijon, and Alèthe de Montbard, both nobles of Burgundy. She was the younger sister of Bernard of Clairvaux, and her entry into the Benedictine priory at Jully, apparently at the urging of her brother, figures in accounts of Bernard of Clairvaux's life.
