= Tescelin le Roux =

Burgundian knight (died 1117)

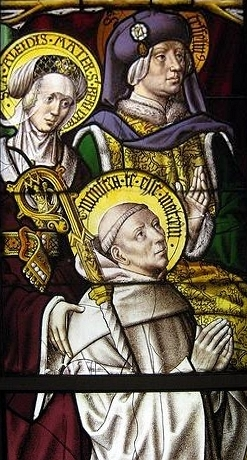
- Stained glass window, originally from Mariawald Abbey, representing Bernard of Clairvaux with his parents Aleth and Tescelin
- Born: c. 1070
- Died: 11 April 1117
- Occupation: Seigneur de Fontaine
- Known for: Father of Saint Bernard

Tescelin le Roux (c. 1070 – 11 April 1117), or Tescelin de Fontaine, Tescelin le Saur, Tescelin Sorus, was a Burgundian knight, keeper of a castle on the road from Paris to Dijon, and father of Saint Bernard of Clairvaux. His castle, which had been largely destroyed, was rebuilt in the 19th century and is now a pilgrimage destination for followers of Saint Bernard.

== Family ==
Tescelin le Roux was born about 1070, son of Tescelin (c. 1040–85), a knight of the lord of Châtillon and Saruc de Grancey. The sketchy available evidence indicates that Tescelin senior was a miles castri, a dependent knight unrelated to his lord. (Note: It has been claimed that Tescelin, who spent most of his life at the castle of the lords of Châtillon, was in some way related to them, and despite the lack of evidence writers since the 17th century have followed this line in trying to prove that Saint Bernard was a member of the highest nobility. According to "Prince Michael of Albany", as a de Grancey, Tescelin's mother may have been connected to the de la Ferte family, one of whom became the Latin patriarch of Jerusalem. "Prince Michael of Albany" was born Michel Lafosse in Brussels in 1958, son of a shopkeeper. He claimed descent from the royal house of Scotland.) Alberic of Trois-Fontaines wrote in the 13th century that Tescelin's mother married Fulk, lord of Aigremont, as well as Tescelin's father. She had a son named Gui by Fulk,

Tescelin is described as having a reddish complexion, almost yellow-haired, commonly known as Sorus, or Le Roux. (Note: Sorus or Saurus was the color of the plumage of a young falcon in its first year. Chestnut-colored horses were called Sor, as were men with fair coloring and auburn hair.) William of St-Thierry said he was "a man of large possessions, gentle in manners, a great lover of the poor, of devoted piety, and of an extreme zeal for justice ... He never took up arms except in defence of his own lands, or in company with his lord...".

In 1085 Tescelin married Aleth de Montbard (c. 1064 – 31 August 1106). Aleth, also called Alith, Elizabeth or Alix, was daughter of Bernard, lord of Montbar. (Note: According to "Prince Michael of Albany" Aleth de Montbard's brother, André de Montbard, was one of the founding members of the Knights Templar, with Hugues de Payens.) Their children were Guy, seigneur de Fontaine, Saint Gerard of Clairvaux, Saint Bernard de Clairvaux (1091–1153), André, Barthélémy, Nivard, Abbé of Hautvilliers and Blessed Ombeline (1092–1141). A chronicler of Saint Bernard says that his parents were "illustrious by their rank and high descent, but more illustrious by their virtues."

== Career ==
Fontaine-lès-Dijon is a steep, tree-covered hill beside the highway from Paris to Dijon. Tescelin and his followers were assigned to protect this strongpoint. A strong house was built on the hill in the 11th century, entrusted to Tescelin le Roux as seigneur de Fontaine.

Tescelin is often listed among the witnesses of ducal donations. For example, he is found around 1100 at the time of the donation of the lands of Marcennay by Odo I, Duke of Burgundy, who was leaving for Jerusalem, in 1100 and 1101 in the second and third renewals of the donation of Marcennay, and between 1102 and 1111 during the judgment of the ducal court against Hugues de Chatillon concerning the forest of Marcennay. Tescelin Sorus is among the signatories of a diploma of Hugh II, Duke of Burgundy, in favour of the Monastery of Saint Marcellus at Chalon-sur-Saône. On 16 February 1106 Tescelin was one of the witnesses when Pope Paschal II consecrated the Church of Saint-Bénigne de Dijon. He received "between his hands" the donation of the village of Pouilly by his cousin Milon de Montbard around 1113. Tescelin is among the witnesses of the charter of foundation of Molesme Abbey.

Alèthe died in 1105 and was buried at the Abbey of St. Benignus at Dijon. The Abbot Jarenton had the images of her six sons engraved on her tomb. Towards the end of his life, in 1116 Tescelin became a monk. His death on 11 April 1117 is recorded in the register of deaths of the Church of St. Benignus at Dijon, where Alith had been buried many years earlier.

== Legacy ==
Saint Bernard was born in what is now the large tower of the present Couvent et Basilique Saint-Bernard. Tescelin's castle was held for three centuries by the Sombernon family, Tescelin's descendants in the female line. During the reign of Louis XIII (1610–43) the castle was converted into a convent for the Congregation of the Feuillants. The convent was suppressed during the French Revolution and the building used for a smithy. The birthplace was restored and transformed from 1881 to 1897. It has become a place of pilgrimage for followers of Saint Bernard.

== Sources ==
- Albany, Prince Michael of; Salhab, Walid Amine (2006), The Knights Templar of the Middle East: The Hidden History of the Islamic Origins of Freemasonry, Weiser Books, ISBN 978-1-57863-346-3
- Base collaborative Pierfit, "Tescelin II, seigneur de Fontaine Le SAUR", Geneanet (in French)
- Beaune, Henri; d'Arbaumont, Jules (1864), La noblesse aux états de Bourgogne de 1350 à 1789, Lamarche
- Bouchard, Constance Brittain (1987), Sword, Miter, and Cloister: Nobility and the Church in Burgundy, 980-1198, Cornell University Press, ISBN 0-8014-1974-3
- Eales, Samuel John (1890), A St. Bernard, Abbot of Clairvaux, Society for promoting Christian knowledge
- Gildas, Father Marie (1907). "St. Bernard of Clairvaux" . Catholic Encyclopedia. Vol. 2.
- L'Histoire de Fontaine (in French), Fontaine-lès-Dijon
- McHattie, Gil (2011), The Knights Templar: Influences from the Past and Impulses for the Future, Temple Lodge Publishing, ISBN 978-1-906999-26-1
- Mignard, Thomas Joachim Alexandre Prosper (1853), Histoire et légende concernant le pays de la Montagne ou le Chatillonnais ..., V. Didron
- Pavèse, Sigrid (2010), Le site Saint-Bernard a Fontaine-lès-Dijon (PDF) (in French), Les Amis du Vieux Fontaine
- Rance, A.-J. (1884), "Le Berceau de Saint Bernard", Revue sextienne historique littéraire, scientifique et archéologique
- "The Forgotten Monarchy Discovered", EsoscienceNews, archived from the original on 2005-03-09
- Veyssière, Laurent (2000), "Différences de vue et de réalization chez Étienne Harding", Unanimité et diversité cisterciennes: filiations, réseaux, relectures du XIIe au XVIIe siècle : actes du quatrième Colloque international du C.E.R.C.O.R., Dijon, 23-25 septembre 1998 (in French), Université de Saint-Etienne, ISBN 978-2-86272-177-4
