= Canjura =

Canjura is a surname. Notable people with the surname include:

- Héctor Canjura (born 1976), Salvadoran footballer
- Noe Canjura (1922–1970), Salvadoran painter
