= Paul Selmersheim =

French architect (1840-1916)

Antoine Paul Selmersheim
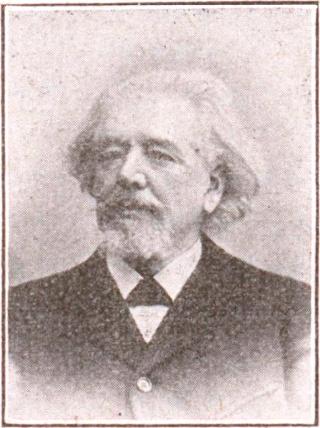
- Born: 23 June 1840; Langres, Haute-Marne, France
- Died: 4 December 1916 (aged 76); Paris, France
- Occupation: Diocesan architect

Antoine Paul Selmersheim (23 June 1840 – 4 December 1916) was a French diocesan architect. He is known for his design, construction, and restoration efforts on many churches during the 19th century. He became inspector-general of historical monuments.

== Life ==
Antoine Paul Selmersheim was born in Langres in 1840. He studied under his uncle, Eugène Millet, in 1862. In 1863 he was admitted to the École des Beaux-Arts, where he won several medals. He worked as a draftsman with Millet on Moulins Cathedral. In 1867 Selmersheim and Louis Sauvageot won first prize in an open competition for restoration of a church in Brest. Selmersheim worked for the commission for historic monuments from 1870, and restored many buildings. Between 1870 and 1873 he built the church of Sainte-Chantal de Dijon.

Selmersheim married Madeleine (or Marie) Victorine Louise Eugénie Naples. Their sons were Pierre Selmersheim and Tony Selmersheim (1871–1971), who also became an architect and worked with Charles Plumet. On 14 April 1875 Paul Selmersheim was named diocesan architect of Troyes, replacing Millet. On 3 March 1879 he became architect of the Moulins Cathedral in place of Louis Gabriel Esmonnot, who had resigned. On 12 January 1885 he succeeded Paul François Naples, who had died, as diocesan architect of Langres. From 1885 he was a member of the historical monuments commission, and later became inspector-general. In 1888 he was admitted to the Société Centrale des Architectes français.

Antoine Paul Selmersheim died on 4 December 1916 at the age of 76. He was buried in the Cimetière du Nord in Paris.

== Principal works ==
- Beaune, church of Notre-Dame (restoration: 1888)
- Chartres Cathedral (restoration)
- Clermont, Oise, Hôtel de Ville (restoration: 1875)
- Crépy-en-Valois church (restoration)
- Dijon, Palace of the Dukes of Burgundy (restoration)
- Dijon, church of Saint-Marie-de-Chantal (construction: 1870–73)
- Épernay, church of Notre-Dame (construction: 1898–1915)
- Fontaine-lès-Dijon, Basilica (construction)
- Fontaine-lès-Dijon, Château (restoration)
- Morienval church (restoration)
- Moulins Cathedral (restoration: 1865) assisted Millet as draftsman
- Noyon Notre-Dame (restoration)
- Paris Cathedral (restoration)
- Saint-Germain-en-Laye, Château de Saint-Germain-en-Laye (restoration – with Millet)
- Saint-Leu-d'Esserent (restoration)
- Saint-Menoux, Allier, church (restoration)
- Souvigny church (restoration)
- Troyes Cathedral (restoration)
- Troyes, Basilica of St. Urbain (restoration : 1876–1905)
- Varenne-l'Arconce, church of Saint-Pierre-aux-Liens (restoration)

== Publications ==
Selmersheim paid tribute to Millet in an 1892 limited edition of Millet's Monographie de la restauration du château de Saint Germain en Laye. The monograph describes and reproduces 100 of Millet's drawings.

- Selmersheim, Paul (1892). preface. Monographie de la restauration du château de Saint Germain en Laye. By Millet, Eugène. Île-de-France: Silvestre & cie.

== Awards ==
In 1873 Selmersheim won a 2nd medal at the Salon for a project to restore the palace of the Dukes of Burgundy in Dijon. In 1878 he won a medal at the Exposition Universelle. He also won awards at the Salons or Expositions of 1876, 1889 and 1900. He won the grand prize at the 1911 Turin International.

== Sources ==
- "Eugène Millet". montjoye.net. Chateau et Patrimonie de France.
- Leniaud, Jean-Michel (ed.). "SELMERSHEIM Antoine, Paul" (in French). École nationale des chartes.
- Nizet, Charles (1917). "Paul Selmersheim". L'Architecture. Bulletin publié par la Société centrale des architectes pendant la durée de la guerre (in French). Paris: Académie d'architecture (France).
- "Tony Selmersheim" (in French). Musée d'Orsay. 2006.
