= Noe Canjura =

- Born: August 14, 1922; Apopa, El Salvador
- Died: September 29, 1970 (aged 48); Morienval, France
- Resting place: Notre Dame de Morienval Cemetery, Morienval, France
- Education: Academy of Painting of Valero Lecha; École nationale supérieure des Beaux-Arts
- Known for: Painting
- Movement: Modern art
- Spouse: Madeleine Bachelet

Noe Canjura (Apopa, El Salvador, 14 August 1922 – Morienval, France, 29 September 1970) was a Salvadoran painter and a prominent figure in 20th century modern art in France. His art was 'imbued with a social conscience and laden with religious symbolism'.

== Early life ==
Noe Canjura was born in 1922 in Apopa, a village in the Republic of El Salvador in Central America, to a humble family of landless peasants. The infertile soil of the region meant survival was difficult. Canjura worked in a sawmill- often spending the night there- to pay part of his school expenses and lessen the load on his father.

He developed an interest in drawing at the age of seventeen, subsequently studying painting at the Academy of Painting of Valero Lecha in San Salvador from 1942 to 1946. From 1942 onward, Canjura's work was exhibited throughout El Salvador, and later also in Guatemala. In 1948 he embarked on study in Mexico City; there, he was strongly influenced by Diego Rivera, then at the height of his fame. Canjura later gained inspiration from the art of Gauguin, particularly his concepts of formal order in painting and the use of curves. That year also saw his first exhibition in the United States.

== Life in Paris ==
In 1949, supported by a five-year government scholarship, Canjura went to France to study at the École nationale supérieure des Beaux-Arts. Despite influence from the work of Courbet and Le Nain, he preferred to represent the sombre, harsh living conditions of his native country. He had his first one-man show in Paris in 1953, and lived there from then on. To support himself he undertook manual labour. His marriage to Madeleine Bachelet, also an artist, brought a greater financial security that allowed him to dedicate himself to his art. Returning briefly to El Salvador in 1957, the influence of his life in Paris led him to see his country from a new perspective, and colour and light came to play a greater part in his works. The city of Paris purchased four of Canjura's paintings between 1959 and 1965 for its permanent collection.

Canjura was a member of the Société Nationale des Beaux-Arts and the Salon de la Jeune Peinture. He was a regular exhibitor, and invited every year to Maurice Boitel's group in the Salon "Comparaisons". The National Museum of El Salvador and the Hamishka Leomanouth Museum at Ein Harod, Israel also purchased his paintings. He was awarded the "Prune d'Argent" by the Salon Peintres de Provence in 1965.

== Death and legacy ==
Canjura died in Morienval, France on 29 September 1970, aged 48, and buried at the cemetery of Notre Dame de Morienval. He was survived by his daughter and granddaughter.

He is regarded as 'an almost mythical figure in El Salvador- the barefoot goatherd... who went on to be a successful artist in Paris'; his work is considered to be influenced by 'the memory of the dramatic colors and of the tropical light of El Salvador'. His time in France led to the development of 'an increasingly abstract style of luminous colours and diffused shapes'.
