= Alèthe de Montbard =

French female saint

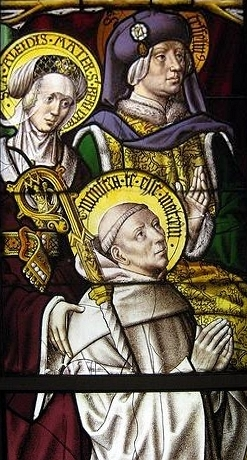
- Stained glass window, originally from Cistercian abbey Mariawald, representing Saint Bernard of Clairvaux with his parents Aleth (Aleidis) and Tescelin (Tesselinus); inscriptions of the nimbusses: SCA ALEIDIS MATER S BERNARDI / S TESSELINUS / MONSTRA TE ESSE MATREM (prayer of St Bernard to the Virgin)
- Born: 1070; Montbard
- Died: 1 September 1107 (aged 37)
- Honored in: Catholic Church
- Feast: 4 April

Alèthe de Montbard or Aleth, Alette (1070–1107) also known as Alix or Alice, is a saint and mother of Saint Bernard of Clairvaux. Her feast day is celebrated on 4 April. Alèthe is a variant of the Greek name "Alethea," meaning "truth" or "reality".

Alèthe was the daughter of the first Count Bernard I de Montbard (1040–1103) in Burgundy. She spent her childhood at the Château de Montbard and was the sister of André de Montbard, one of the nine founders of the Order of the Knights Templar and fifth Grand master of the order.

It seems that Alèthe had initially planned (or her parents had planned for her) to enter a convent, but at the age of fifteen, Tescelin came forward and requested her hand in marriage. This information is gleaned from the Vita Quarta, possibly through Bernard's cousin Robert.

In 1085, Alèthe, aged 15, married Tescelin le Roux (also called Tescelin de Fontaine and Tescelin Sorus), a knight and the lord of Fontaine-lès-Dijon, from Châtillon-sur-Seine and vassal of Duke Eudes I of Burgundy. Alèthe hailed from the uppermost ranks of nobility, whereas her husband belonged to a more modest, yet still honorable, noble lineage. Tescelin's parents are not known, but he was related to Josbert de la Ferté, vicomte of Dijon and seneschal of Hugh, Count of Champagne. Josbert played a central role in the foundation of Clairvaux. Together, Alèthe and Tescelin had six sons and a daughter at the Château de Fontaine-lès-Dijon, including Saint Bernard of Clairvaux, Saint Gérard, and Saint Ombeline. The room where St Bernard was born, on the ground floor of one of the castle's towers, was converted into a chapel in the 15th century and entrusted to the congregation of the Feuillants (reformed Cistercians) of Dijon. The castle is now part of a group of buildings in Fontaine-lès-Dijon, France, known as Couvent et Basilique Saint-Bernard (Saint Bernard's Convent and Basilica) which include a convent, basilica and church set in a public park.

In 1102, Alèthe who devoted herself to helping the neediest, built a chapel dedicated to Saint Ambrosinian opposite the castle. The church of Saint-Bernard de Fontaine-lès-Dijon was later built on the site of this chapel.

It is said that Bernard was deeply influenced by his mother Aleth, whose guidance played a significant role in shaping his life. After her death in 1107, Bernard reflected on this event as the moment when his journey toward personal transformation truly began. Deeply affected by her death at the young age of 17, her third son Bernard made the decision to become a monk at the abbey of Citeaux. Alèthe then appeared to him, all dressed in white, to confirm that 'God had chosen him' for a great destiny and that he should lead his brothers in the monastic life.

Alèthe died on 1 September 1107, aged 37, on the feast day of St. Ambrosinien, to whom his chapel was dedicated. Her body was solemnly transferred to the crypt of St. Benignus of Dijon, as she was already considered a saint. Her tomb was surrounded by great devotion for over 100 years. At the end of the 12th century, her tomb was carved with the figures of her six sons, all of whom became Cistercian monks following in the footsteps of their brother Saint Bernard. Her daughter, Ombeline, also entered the Holy Orders in 1132 and became abbess of the Cistercian monastery of Jully Les Nonains and was declared a saint. Her husband, Tescelin, retired at the end of his life to the monastery of Citeaux. In 1250, the Abbot of Claivaux had the remains of Blessed Alèthe transferred to his monastery next to the tomb of her son Saint Bernard.
