= Notre Dame de Morienval =

Morienval Abbey
- French: Abbaye Notre-Dame de Morienval; Église Saint-Denis de Morienval
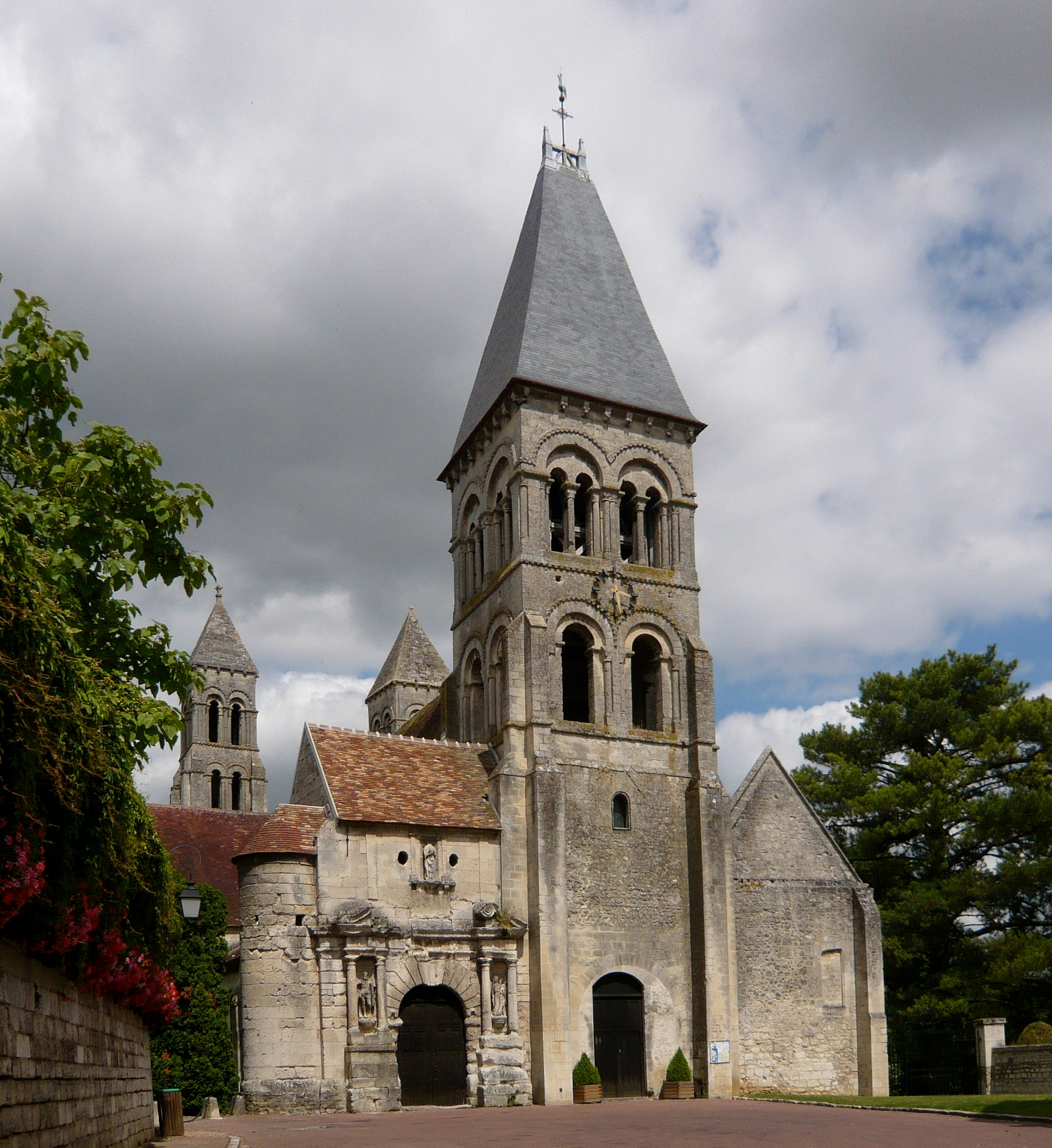
- Facade of Our Lady of Morienval, 2012

- Location in France
- 49°17′53″N 2°55′20″E
- Location: Morienval, Oise Department
- Country: France
- Denomination: Roman Catholic
- Religious order: Order of Saint Benedict

History
- Founded: c. 860
- Dedication: Virgin Mary, St. Denis

Administration
- Diocese: Roman Catholic Diocese of Soissons
- Parish: Saint-Pierre in the Autumn Valley

Monument historique
- Official name: Église abbatiale de bénédictines Notre-Dame
- Type: Église
- Criteria: Abbey (1840); Ancient Cross (1924); Building and Grounds (1984)
- Designated: 1840, 1924, 1984
- Reference no.: IA60001565

The Abbey of Notre Dame de Morienval (Our Lady of Morienval) or the Church of St. Denis (French: Abbaye Notre-Dame de Morienval, Église Saint-Denis) is a former Benedictine church located in Morienval, Oise Department, northern France. Since the abolition of the nunnery in 1745, the abbey has functioned as the parish church for Morienval. The few convent buildings not demolished after the French Revolution are privately owned and are not open to the public.

== History ==
Though the cartulary for the original Benedictine abbey of Morienval survives, it does not list any act or deed marking its beginning. There do not exist any Papal bulls or other archival material that give the date of the abbey's foundation. The oldest document in the cartulary is a charter from 930, during the reign of King Charles the Simple, that confirmed a donation made to the abbey by Charles the Bald in the 840s. The charter also refers to the abbey as "the brothers of Sainte-Marie de Morienval", indicating a male religious institution that had vanished by 1161, and that the abbey had been destroyed by fire in 895, likely by the Vikings. Charles the Simple and Queen Ermentrude of Orléans maintained a residence at Morienval they frequently spent time at, which may have led to them establishing the abbey.

=== Architectural history ===
There is scant archival material detailing Morienval Abbey's construction. As such, the building of the abbey is a process that has had to be tracked by archaeological analysis conducted between 1855 and 1900 by Émile Boeswillwald and Paul Selmersheim. Unfortunately, little of the observations made by these digs can be substantiated because of construction directed by Selmersheim later. Three general periods have been delineated for the construction of the abbey between 1050 and 1135. This is followed by periods of renovation and restoration from 1608 to 1690, 1878, and from 1900 to 1903. Numerous small additions or alterations have been made to the abbey throughout its history.

=== Middle Ages ===
In 920, the year of Charles the Simple's letter confirming the abbey, Morienval Abbey's abbot was a layman, the future King Robert I of France. Robert I must have received the abbey as a good, leading historian Eugène Lefèvre-Pontalis to conclude that the property abbey had for some time before been taken by various lords. This was the case for many ecclesiastical institutions until the restitution movement inspired by the Gregorian Reform. Another of Morienval's abbots had been, with Hugh the Abbot, the guardian of Robert the Strong's children after his death.

== Architecture ==
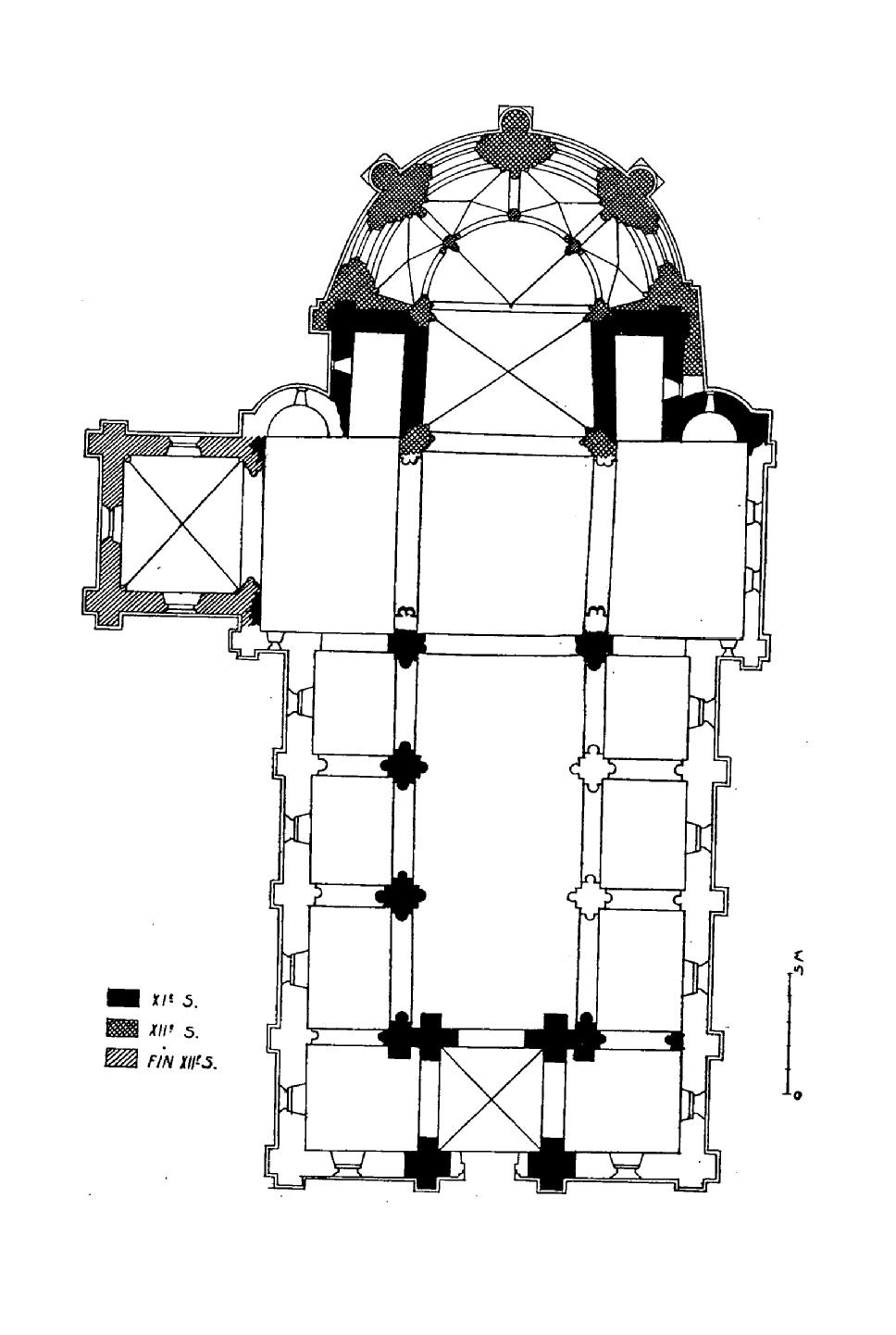
Plan of the church as it appeared in the mid-12th century

The abbey church, now dedicated to Saint Denis, was built according to a roughly symmetrical cruciform plan that has generally remained unchanged, except for the addition of the Early Gothic chapel. The church stands on a northeast–southwest orientation, irregular for a church. Its layout consists of a one-bay narthex at the base, a three-bay nave with two aisles in the middle, a single-bay transept with attached bays flanking the choir that were the bases to a pair of rectangular towers, one bay long and connected to a semicircular apse of the same length, and an ambulatory four bays long. There is an imbalance in the nave's aisles, though they are of the same length.
