= Eugène Millet =

French architect (1819–1879)

Eugène Louis Millet
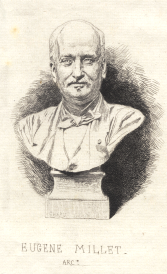
- Born: 21 May 1819; Paris, France
- Died: 24 February 1879 (aged 59); Cannes, France
- Occupation: Architect

Eugène Louis Millet (21 May 1819 – 24 February 1879) was a French architect. He planned and began the restoration of the Château de Saint-Germain-en-Laye, home of the Museum of National Antiquities.

== Life ==
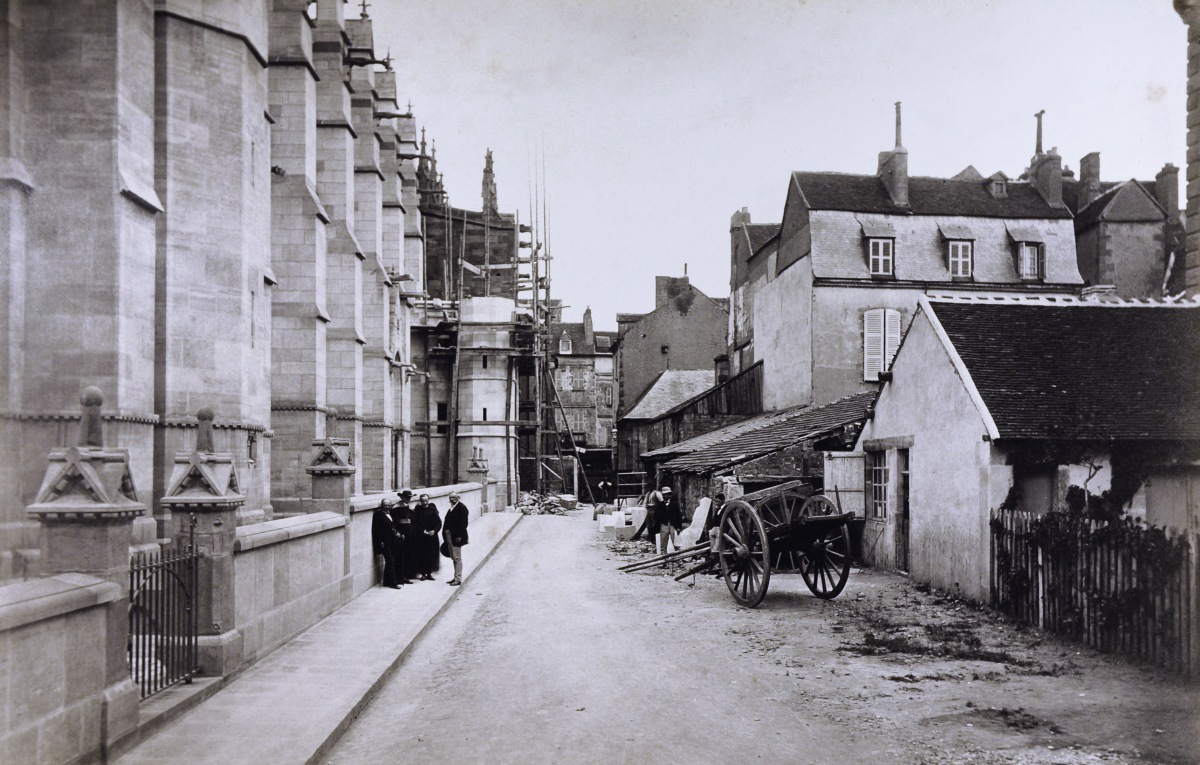
Moulins Cathedral 1860s. Bishop Simon Louis Marie de Dreux-Brézé with priest and two laymen, probably Millet and Paul Selmersheim

Eugène Millet was born in Paris on 21 May 1819. He was in the class of 1837 at the École des Beaux-Arts (School of Fine Arts), where he studied under Henri Labrouste and Eugène Viollet-le-Duc. Millet recalled that Labrouste provided his own drawings to teach his pupils, including studies of classical Italian works and his own designs, since he did not trust the École's materials and was trying to reinvent the discipline of architecture. Millet later became associated with the Gothic Revival led by Viollet-le-Duc.

Millet became an assistant to Viollet-le-Duc in 1847 in the Documents service. After 1848 Millet was appointed architect for the buildings of the dioceses of Troyes and Châlons-sur-Marne. In 1853 the prefect of the Aube started a dispute with Millet over Troyes Cathedral, claiming he was neglecting the work and should be replaced. Viollet-le-Duc wrote a passionate tribute in Millet's defense, giving high praise for a quality of the work he had done at Troyes in the face of many difficulties. The tribute is remarkable in that Viollet-le-Duc was not known for modesty about his own skills. In 1857 Millet continued the project of building the Moulins Cathedral that had been started by Jean-Baptiste Lassus.

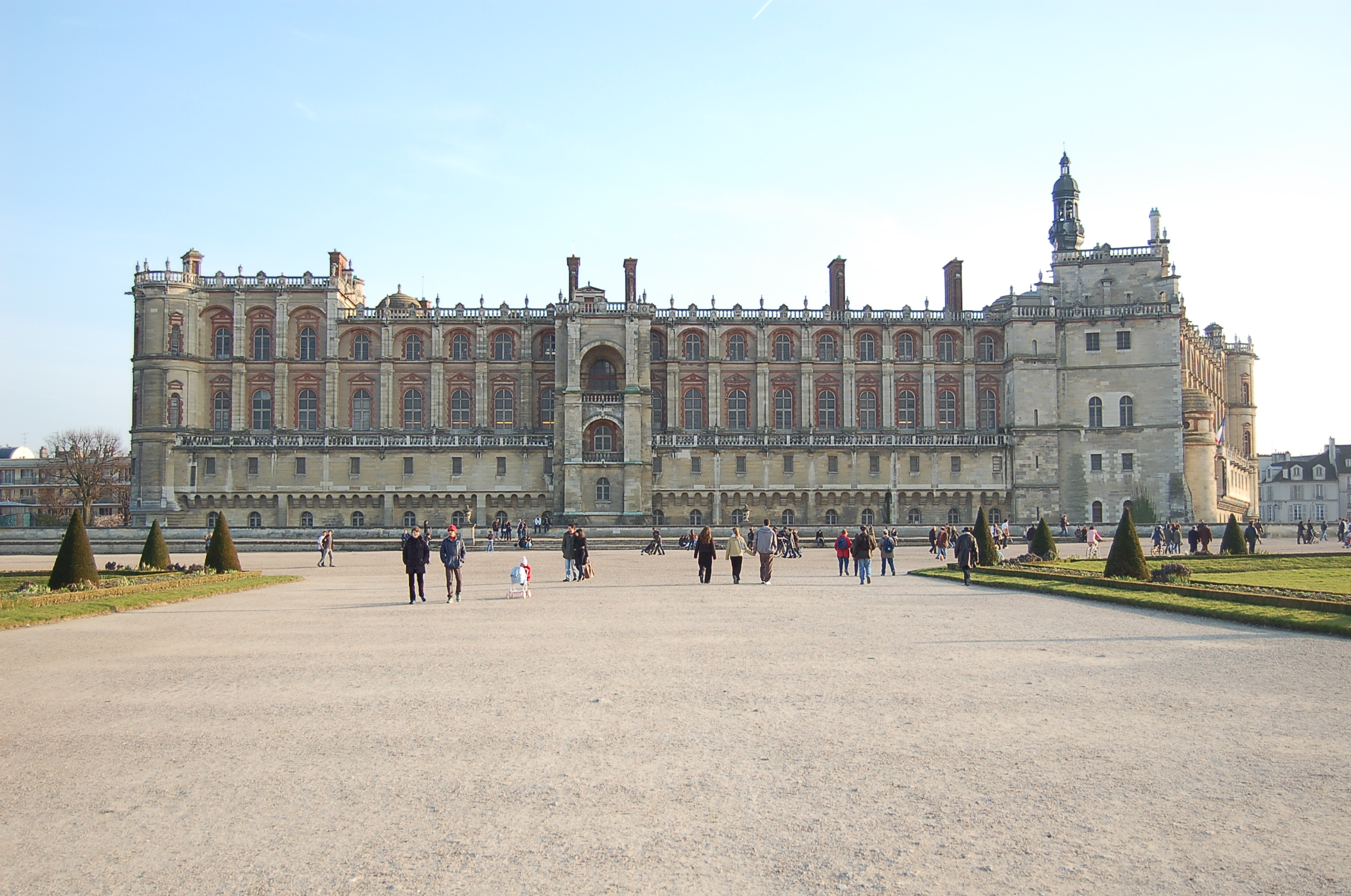
Château de Saint-Germain-en-Laye

Millet was assigned the task of restoring the Château de Saint-Germain-en-Laye in 1855, and was told to remove all traces of the cells that the Ministry of War had installed when it was used as a prison between 1836 and 1855. In 1857 he reported that all the partitions forming the cells and dungeons had been demolished and the rest of the chateau had been cleaned. He was given the job of restoring the château to hold the planned National Museum of Antiquities. He proposed two alternatives. The first was to keep the château with all its additions, while consolidating the parts that were in poor condition or incomplete. The second, which was approved, was to remove the additions and restore it to its state under Francis I of France.

Millet worked closely with Count Émilien de Nieuwerkerke, superintendent of the École des Beaux-Arts, with the artillery officer Jean-Baptiste Verchère de Reffye and with Alexandre Bertrand, the first conservator of the museum. Work began in 1862 with the destruction of the West pavilion. The work progressed from the north-west angle of the château and advanced eastward around the building, restoring the lines of the donjon of Charles V of France that had been concealed by the additions of Louis XIV. Stones for exterior repair were cut in the grounds of the chateau. The interior was floored in oak, with walls painted with designs and decorations, and the windows were individually designed.

On 7 July 1874 Millet was given responsibility for the diocesan buildings of Reims and for completing the Clermont-Ferrand Cathedral in place of Viollet-le-Duc, who had resigned. In 1875 Millet replaced Labrouste as inspector-general of diocesan buildings. He was also professor of construction at the École des Beaux-Arts.

== Death and legacy ==
Eugène Millet died in Cannes on 24 February 1879. He is buried in Saint Germain en Laye in a tomb designed by Viollet le Duc, who himself died later that year. His nephew, the architect Paul Selmersheim, paid tribute to Millet in a limited edition of Millet's Monographie de la restauration du château de Saint Germain en Laye. The monograph describes and reproduces 100 of Millet's drawings. Millet left behind 318 very detailed drawings of the planned Château de Saint-Germain. Auguste Lafollye took over responsibility on Millet's death, continuing until 1889. The work was finally completed in 1907 by Honoré Daumet, who placed an inscription above the entrance saying "This château was restored from 1862 to 1906 by Eugène Millet."

== Restorations ==
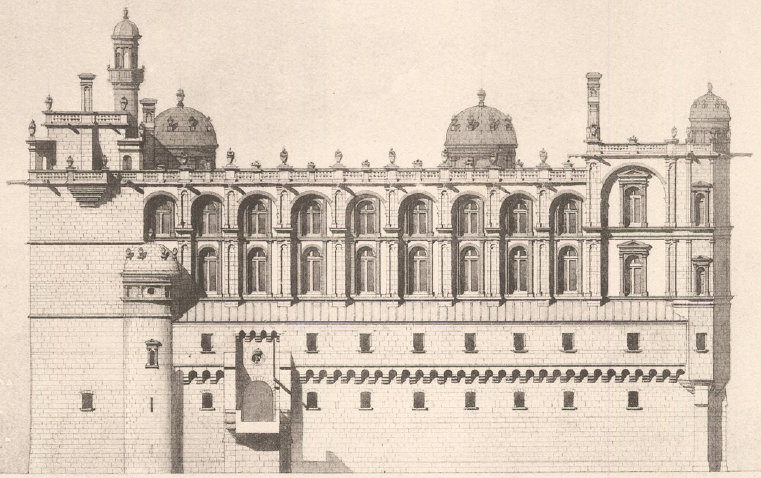
Château de Saint-Germain-en-Laye (from the 1892 monograph)

An incomplete list of buildings with which Millet was involved:

- Eglise d'Ebreuil, Allier
- Clermont Ferrand (1874)
- Eglise de Saint-Benoît-sur-Loire
- Eglises de Souvigny, Allier
- Eglise Notre-Dame-des Menus; Boulogne (1860–65)
- Cathédrale de Moulins (1857)
- Cathédrale de Reims (1875–79)
- Saint Pierre de Montmartre (1872)
- Cathédrale Saint-Pierre; Saint Paul, Champagne – Ardennes
- Saint Hilaire, Saône et Loire (1851)
- Eglise de Paray le Monial (1856)
- Saint-Fiacre; Fontenailles
- Château de Saint Germain en Laye, Yvelines (1859–79)
- Pavillon de la Muette, Saint Germain en Laye, Yvelines (1862)
- Sainte Chapelle, Saint Germain en Laye, Yvelines
- Eglise de Souvigny, Allier
- Eglise Paroissiale Saint-Etienne, Mareil-Marly. Yvelines (1872–79)
- Eglise Saint Nicolas, Maisons-lafitte, Yvelines (1868–79)

== Publications ==
- Millet, Eugène (1869). "plans des salles". Promenades au musée de Saint-Germain – catalogue illustré de 79 figures. By Gabriel de Mortillet. Arthur Rhoné, illustrations. Paris: C. Reinwald. p. 88.
- Millet, Eugène (1877). "Notice sur l'église Saint-Pierre-de-Montmartre à Paris". Encyclopédie d'architecture. Vol. 6. Paris: A. Morel. p. 14.
- Millet, Eugène (1882). "Henri Labrouste, architecte,... sa vie, ses œuvres". Bulletin de la Société centrale des architectes 1879-1880. Paris: impr. de C. Marpon et E. Flammarion. p. 20.
- Millet, Eugène (1892). Monographie de la restauration du château de Saint Germain en Laye. Paul Selmersheim, preface. Île-de-France: Silvestre & cie.

== Sources ==
- Bélier, Corinne; Bergdoll, Barry; Le Cœur, Marc; Bressani, Martin (2013). Henri Labrouste: Structure Brought to Light. The Museum of Modern Art. ISBN 978-0-87070-839-8.
- Boulet, François (2006). Leçon d'histoire de France Saint-Germain-en-Laye: Des antiquités nationales à une ville internationale. DISLAB. ISBN 978-2-9520091-8-8.
- "Eugène Millet". montjoye.net. Chateau et Patrimonie de France.
- "Eugène Millet (1819–1879)" (PDF) (in French). Société des Amis du Musée d'Archéologie nationale et du château de Saint-Germain-en-Laye. Archived from the original (PDF) on 2021-08-30.
- Leniaud, Jean-Michel (2015). "MILLET Eugène" (in French). École nationale des chartes, Sorbonne.
- Normand, Charles (1888). L'Ami des monuments. s.n.
- Pierre, Marcel; Pierre, Maryse (2006). "Eugène Millet (1819–1879)". Clochers de Basse-Auvergne (in French). EDITIONS CREER. ISBN 978-2-84819-039-6.
