= Arthur Rhoné =

Arthur-Ali Rhoné
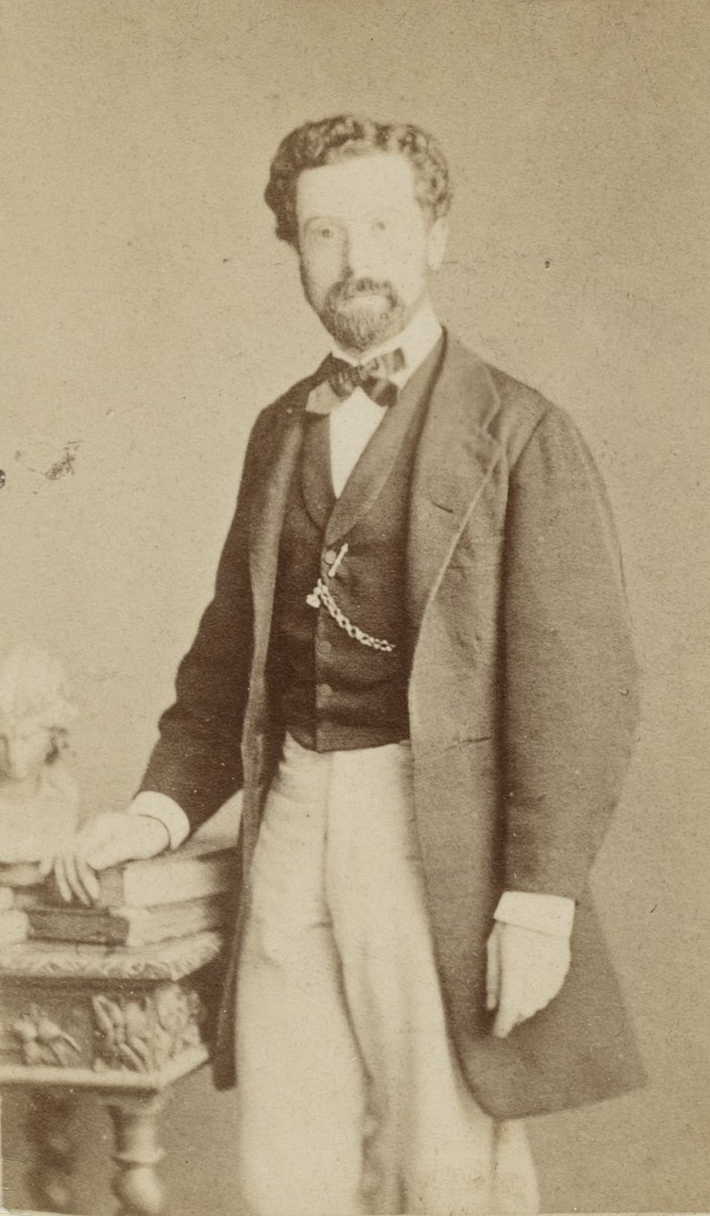
- Rhoné in 1886
- Born: 14 March 1836; Paris, France
- Died: 7 June 1910 (aged 74); Paris, France
- Occupation: Amateur scholar
- Known for: Egyptology

Arthur-Ali Rhoné (14 March 1836 – 7 June 1910) was a wealthy amateur French Arabist and Egyptologist. He was known for his efforts to prevent the vandalism of monuments in Cairo, Egypt, and in Paris, France. Often the destruction was done in the name of restoration, or of other improvements to the city.

== Life ==
=== Early years (1836–65) ===
Arthur Rhoné was born in Paris on 14 March 1836. He was the eldest child of a Catholic family that had a good income from the Anzin mines, which had been discovered by an ancestor. His father, Léon Rhoné, Master of Requests (maître des requêtes) at the court of auditors, died prematurely in 1847.

In November 1864 Rhoné met Théodule Devéria, conservator of the Egyptian antiquities in the Louvre. A month later Rhoné, Devéria and some friends sailed to Egypt, where he saw Alexandria, Cairo, Memphis, and the work on the Suez Canal by Ferdinand de Lesseps. This was Devéria's third visit to Egypt, in which he made drawings and took photographs that were reproduced in an album of 77 plates. The party went on to the Holy Land, Damascus and Istanbul. The voyage made a great impression on Rhoné.

=== Work in France (1865–79) ===
On his return to France in 1865 Rhoné planned a major work with his companions on ancient Egypt with historical notes on the hieroglyphs, natural history and history of the pharaohs. He would provide a precise topography of Cairo with supporting maps and explanatory notes about the city's monuments. However, there were delays in starting the project, and his lack of professional status proved a drawback. A few months later he married Gabrielle Bertrand, daughter of the mathematician and academician Joseph Bertrand.

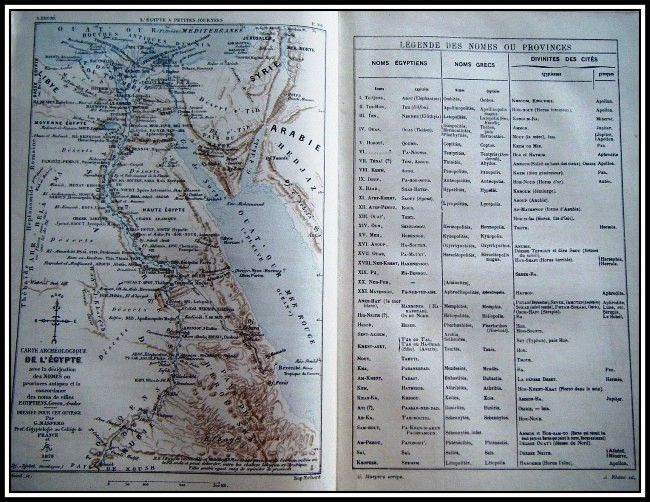
Map from Rhoné's 1877 L'Egypte à petites journées : études et souvenirs

In 1867 Rhoné joined the newly created National Museum of Antiquities (Musée des Antiquités nationales) in Saint-Germain-en-Laye. He helped prepare a guide to the museum. He worked on a book about his memories of Egypt. The first volume, describing Cairo and its surroundings, appeared at the end of 1877. The second volume, which was to be about Upper Egypt, was never published. He helped Auguste Mariette as a voluntary assistant with the "Ancient Egyptian House" for the Exposition Universelle of 1878. He also helped subsidize de Lesseps' business in Egypt.

=== Further work in Egypt (1879–82) ===
At the start of 1879 Rhoné returned to Egypt with a group of artist friends, and went on the Palestine. In Egypt he spent all his time on Cairo, to which he returned with Mariette. In October 1878 exceptionally high waters of the Nile had inundated the Musée de Boulaq beside of the river. The building was damaged, the museum was closed, antiquities had to be packed in cases and many of the old papers were destroyed. This may have been when Rhoné decided to alert Paris to the impact of the improvements by the Khedive Isma'il Pasha on the ancient city, which had been relatively undisturbed in 1865.

Rhone did much to publicize the discoveries of Egyptology in articles in the Gazette des Beaux-Arts and Le Magasin pittoresque. He published photographs of the Boulaq museum and the archaeological excavations. He also wrote of the destruction in Cairo since his last visit. He detailed the "vandalisme restaurateur", the "vandalism of the restorer", on buildings such as the Mosque of Sultan al-Muayyad, a fifteenth century masterpiece. On 28 December 1880 a permanent archaeological mission was established in Cairo. Rhoné did not acknowledge that the Ottomans had helped preserve the fabric of Cairo. In 1881 he wrote "the city of Cairo was still intact, at least in the sense that its monuments continued to fall quietly into ruin following the eternal way of the Orient; at least nothing was attempted in the way of works called 'improvement' and 'Restoration.'"

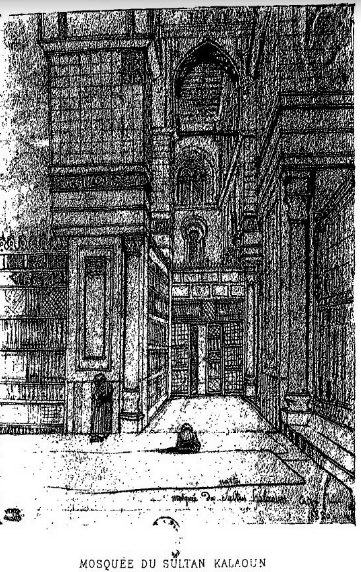
Mosquée du Sultan Kalaoun from L'Egypte à petites journées

Rhoné was concerned with the impact of Italian architects and builders, who undertook much of the construction in Cairo at the time, introducing what he called "Italian Gothic style" buildings. He argued that some of the principles of Eugène Viollet-le-Duc should be followed, specifically that of respecting local building techniques. In restoration work, he agreed with Viollet-le-Duc about the need to understand the original context when a monument was built, and with William Morris about the need to respect and preserve all periods of a building. He used the Al-Hussein and Sayyida Zaynab mosques as examples of the damage done by insensitive restorers.

A decree of 10 January 1881 charged Rhoné with a mission to the East, particularly Egypt, to study Arab and Egyptian monuments. He immersed himself in the study of Cairo in the early 15th century, and traced the enclosure of the Fatimid palace in the heart of the old city. The orientalist Paul Ravaisse was impressed by Rhoné's innovative approach and valuable results, and in September 1881 arranged for Rhoné's mission to be extended by another year, this time with a small salary. In October 1881 Rhoné returned to Cairo with his family for a nine-month stay in which he concentrated on ancient Egyptian remains, although he also studied the Arab monuments and the topology of Cairo. The Comité de Conservation des Monuments de l'Art Arabe (Commission for Conservation of Monuments of Arab Art) was established by decree of the Khedive on 18 December 1881, due in part to the pressure from Rhoné and his friends.

=== Later career (1882–1910) ===
In the summer of 1882 Rhoné refused an invitation to further extend his mission in Cairo. On his return to Paris Rhoné became involved in preserving that city, attacking the changes being made by Georges-Eugène Haussmann. He made one further trip to the East, when he visited Petra with Augé de Lassus. In 1884 he lost all sight in one eye, and could only see poorly with the other. Rhoné published Réflexions sur l’enlaidissement progressif des villes qu’on embellit (Reflections on the progressive disfiguration of cities by improvements) in 1889. In this work he denounced the treatment of ancient Parisian buildings and monuments, with removal of architectural elements that did not suit modern taste, addition of incongruous modern structures beside the old and destruction monuments by great boulevards. Arthur Rhoné died in Paris on 7 June 1910.

== Memberships ==
Rhoné was a member of various societies:

- Société de l'histoire de Paris et de l'Île-de-France: member (1874–96)
- Société des amis des monuments parisiens: associate (1885–1900), committee member and treasurer (1886–90)
- Société historique du VIe arrondissement de Paris: member of the administrative council (1898–1910)
- Société historique et archéologique des VIIIe et XVIIe arrondissements de Paris
- Société nationale des antiquaires de France: correspondent (1889)

== Publications ==
- Arthur Rhoné (1869). "illustrations". Promenades au musée de Saint-Germain – catalogue illustré de 79 figures. By Gabriel de Mortillet. Eugène Millet, plans des salles. Paris: C. Reinwald. p. 88.
- Arthur Rhoné (1877). L'Egypte à petites journées : études et souvenirs. Le Kaire et ses environs. Also includes Exposé des croyances religieuses de l'Egypte antique by M. Maspero. Paris: Ernest Leroux. p. 430.
- Arthur Rhoné (1878). "L'Égypte antique". L'Art ancien à l'Exposition de 1878. Paris: A. Quantin. p. 50.
- Arthur Rhoné (1879). "L'Égypte à l'Exposition universelle de 1878". Gazette des Beaux-Arts. XVIII: 441–469.
- Arthur Rhoné (September 1881). "Auguste Mariette : esquisse de sa vie et de ses travaux avec une bibliographie de ses œuvres". Gazette des Beaux-Arts: 28.
- Arthur Rhoné (1882). Coup d'œil sur l'état du Caire ancien et moderne. Extract from the Gazette des Beaux-Arts November 1881, January and February 1882. Paris: A. Quantin. p. 48.
- Arthur Rhoné (1883). "Récit de la trouvaille des momies royales de Deïr el Bahari, à Thèbes, faite en 1881, par M-Maspero,...". Gazette des Beaux-Arts. XXVII. Paris: 51–60, 127–146.
- Arthur Rhoné (1883–84). Mariette-Bey, le Sérapeum de Memphis et le musée de Boulaq. Collection of articles from the Magasin pittoresque, 1883–84. Paris.
- Arthur Rhoné (1885–86). Le Vandalisme à Paris. Collection of articles from the Chronique des arts (1885–86) and the Bulletin de la Société des amis des monuments parisiens (1886).
- Arthur Rhoné (1886). "A propos du Métropolitain. Chronique du vandalisme". Bulletin de la Société des Amis des Monuments parisiens. I: 82–86.
- Arthur Rhoné (1889). "Réflexions sur l'enlaidissement progressif des villes qu'on embellit". Bulletin de la Société des Amis des Monuments parisiens. tome III: 92–110.

== Sources ==
- Bajac, Quentin (2013-12-16). "Deveria, Achilles (1800-1857) and Théodule (1831-1871)". In John Hannavy (ed.). Encyclopedia of Nineteenth-Century Photography. Routledge. ISBN 978-1-135-87327-1.
- Bruwier, Marie-Cécile (1994). Présence de l'Egypte: dans les collections de la Bibliotheque universitaire Moretus Plantin (in French). Presses universitaires de Namur. ISBN 978-2-87037-199-2.
- Fiori, Ruth (2012-04-13). L'invention du vieux Paris: naissance d'une conscience patrimoniale dans la capitale (in French). Editions Mardaga. ISBN 978-2-8047-0099-7.
- François, Martine; Fiori, Ruth (2013-08-28). "RHONÉ Arthur" (in French). Le comité des travaux historiques et scientifiques.
- Sanders, Paula (2008). Creating Medieval Cairo: Empire, Religion, and Architectural Preservation in Nineteenth-century Egypt. American Univ in Cairo Press. ISBN 978-977-416-095-0.
- Volait, Mercedes (2006). "Arthur-Ali Rhoné (1836-1910) – Du Caire ancien au Vieux-Paris ou le patrimoine au prisme de l'érudition dilettante". Socio-anthropologie (in French). 19.
