= Gerard of Clairvaux (died 1138) =

Gerard of Clairvaux (died 1138) was the older brother of Bernard of Clairvaux. He was the son of Tescelin le Roux and Aleth de Montbard. When Bernard entered Cîteaux with a group of young relatives and friends in 1112, Gerard did not join him. Instead, he participated in the military life, but was injured during a siege of Grancy and was also imprisoned. During his imprisonment, he decided to enter the monastic life and went to Citeaux after his release.

His brother appointed him cellarer and Gerard managed the domestic affairs of abbey. He is said to have become so skillful in manual occupations that builders, smiths, shoemakers, and weavers went to him for advice and instruction. On his way to Rome in 1137 he fell ill at Viterbo. However, he recovered and returned to France but died the next year.

He was eulogized by his brother.

== Veneration ==
The church at La Laigne in Charente Maritime is dedicated to him.

His feast day is June 13.
