= Comité de Conservation des Monuments de l'Art Arabe =

Historic conservation agency in Egypt

Coordinates: 30°02′32″N 31°15′28″E

The Comité de Conservation des Monuments de l'Art Arabe (French for 'Committee for the Conservation of the Monuments of Arab Art') was an organization established in December 1881 by Khedive Tawfiq which was responsible for the preservation of Islamic and Coptic monuments in Egypt. It was an Egyptian institution, part of the Ministry of Charitable Endowments (awqaf in Arabic), but is often referred to by its French title.

The Comité was established partly in response to the neglect and occasional destruction of medieval Cairo which had begun over the course of the 19th century under the regime of Muhammad Ali and his successors, who attempted to modernize Egypt through projects including the construction of new areas of Cairo that followed a European model. French archaeological enthusiasts such as Arthur Rhoné and Gabriel Charmes had helped publicize the issue in France, which created pressure on the Khedive.

The Comité's tasks, split between two sub-committees or commissions, was first to index every Islamic or Coptic monument in Egypt, assess which ones were in need of attention, and then recommend a course of action. Decisions were made based on the monument's condition at the time as well as its architectural or artistic value. The courses of action undertaken ranged from strict preservation to large-scale restoration of single monuments. Strict preservation, which characterized the vast majority of cases, involved the reinforcement, repair, or cleaning of existing structures, while restoration involved the reconstruction of a monument to varying extents, which could make it usable again for the community (as a mosque, for example). Many examples of such reconstructions by the Comité still remain in Cairo today. In some cases, if the monument was in such poor condition that it was not possible to reconstitute it according to its original design, then the building might be dismantled if dangerous and any objects or elements of artistic value would be transferred to the Museum of Arab Art, now known as the Museum of Islamic Art.

The Comité tasked itself with this function partly because of their consideration to tourism in Egypt. Even as early as 1898, the Comité spoke of 'the satisfaction of Egypt's tourist'.

The Comité became part of the Ministry of Education in 1936, and was formally dissolved in 1961. Its responsibilities passed to the Permanent Committee for Islamic and Coptic Monuments, under the Egyptian Antiquities Organization, now known as the Supreme Council of Antiquities. In 2011, the agency tasked with preserving antiquities was named the Ministry of State of Antiquities.
