= Château de Jully =

Ruined building in Bourgogne-Franche-Comté, France

- Location within France
- 47°47′9.24″N 4°16′41.52″E

History
- Original use: Castle

Site notes
- Current use: ruins

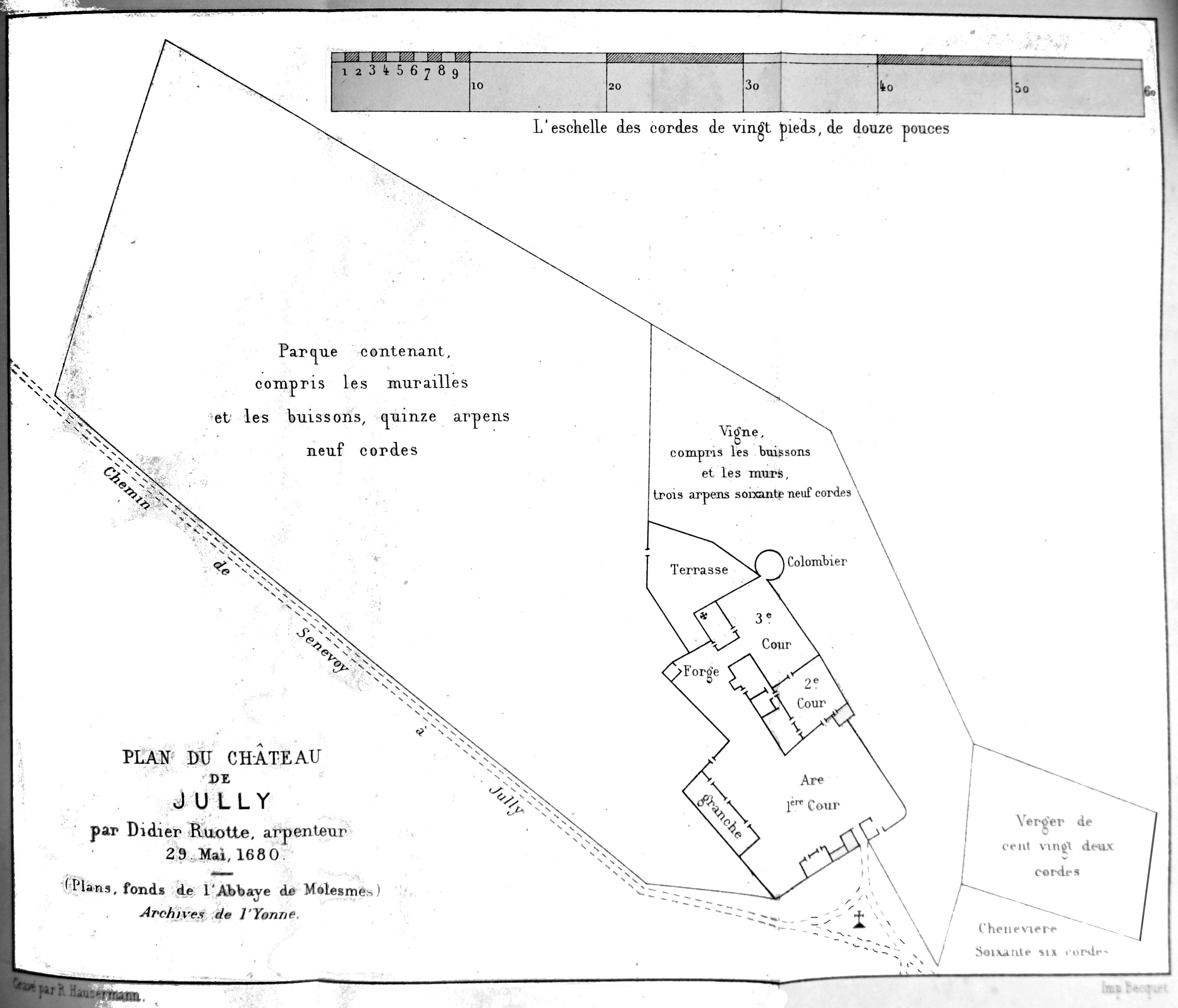
1812 plan

The Château de Jully (also known as the Abbaye de Jully-les-Nonnains) is a ruined building, originally a castle but later having other uses, in the commune of Jully in the Yonne département of France. Built originally in the 10th century, it was subsequently used as a convent, a priory and a farm.

== History ==
The castle was built around 987 by the Count of Tonnerre, Milon I. The counts owned the land until 1144, when Saint Bernard of Clairvaux demanded the castle to establish a convent linked to the Abbey of Molesmes. With the founding of the convent, the castle was named Loge-aux-Convers. It consisted of numerous buildings including a chapel, with a terrace, orchards and meadows. It had fallen into ruins by 1708 and, during the French Revolution, it became a farm. Above the door of the cattle shed is a coat of arms, below which is carved the date 1544. In the early 20th century, builders repairing the roof discovered bundles of parchments, including charters from the 12th and 16th centuries.

== See also ==
- List of castles in France
