= Couvent et Basilique Saint-Bernard =

Group of buildings in Fontaine-lès-Dijon, France

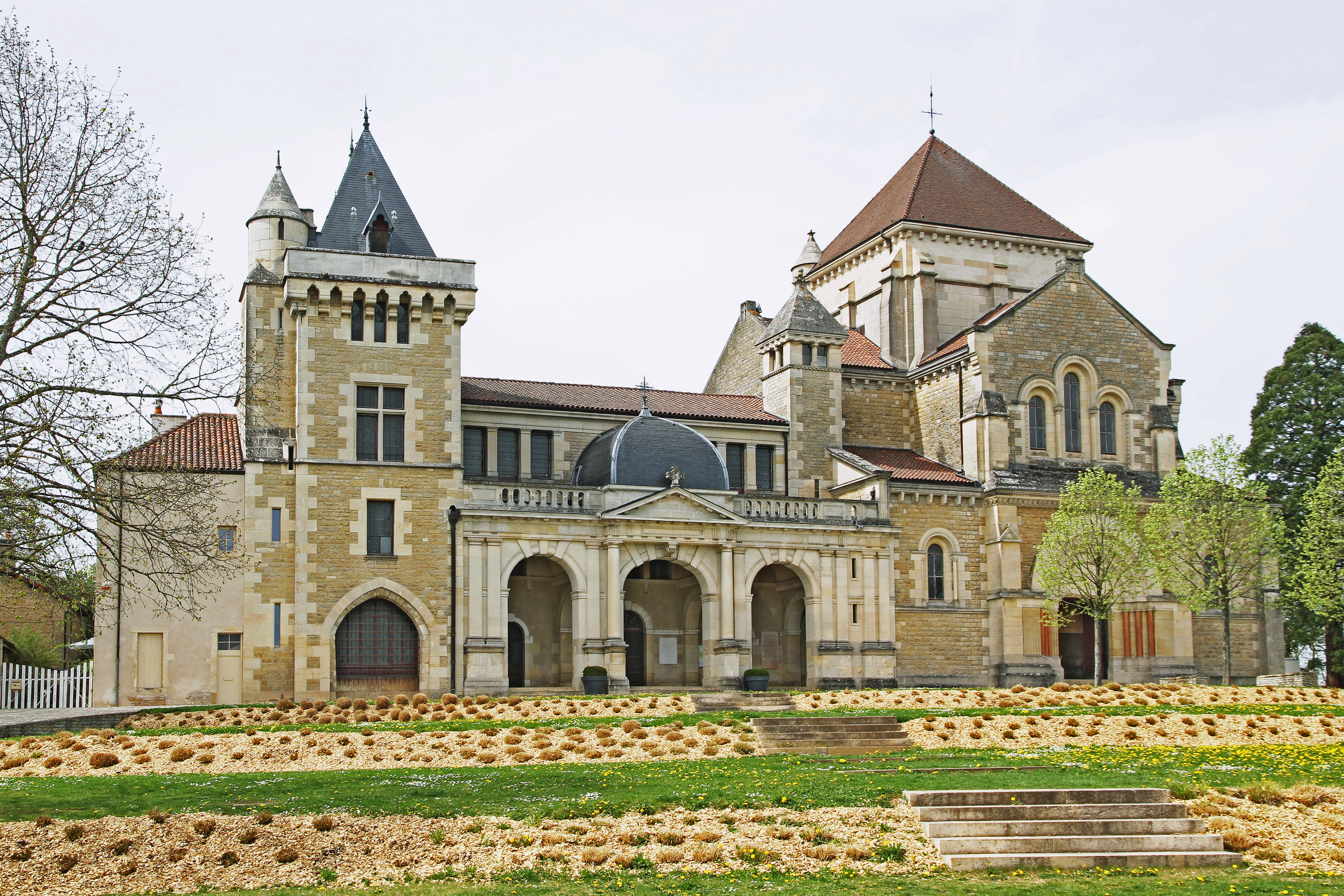
- Convent and basilica of Saint-Bernard in Fontaine-lès-Dijon

- Location in France

Religion
- Affiliation: Catholic Church
- Region: Côte-d'Or

Location
- Country: France
- Coordinates: 47.345819°N 5.015854°E

Architecture
- Groundbreaking: 11th century
- Completed: 19th century
- Designated as NHL: Monument historique

The Couvent et Basilique Saint-Bernard (Saint Bernard's Convent and Basilica) is a group of buildings in Fontaine-lès-Dijon, France, including a convent, basilica and church set in a public park. The complex contains the birthplace of Saint Bernard of Clairvaux (1090–1153), the main reformer of the Cistercians. The present buildings date no further back than the Late Middle Ages, and have been greatly modified since then, with a major renovation in the late 19th century.

== Location ==
The Couvent et Basilique Saint-Bernard is in Fontaine-lès-Dijon, Côte-d'Or, Burgundy, France. It is dedicated to Saint Bernard of Clairvaux, who was born there. The two buildings are at the top of the Butte de Fontaine, a small hill overlooking the town of Dijon and the surrounding countryside. The buildings today are surrounded by a park crisscrossed by pedestrian paths, some leading through the woods. At one time there was a monument to the dead of World War I and World War II, but this has been moved towards the monument to the Franco-Prussian War. An old reservoir has also been demolished, as have all the buildings against the wall of the former monastery garden, opening up the view of Dijon and the plain before the foothills of the Jura Mountains.

== History ==
A strong house was built on the Butte de Fontaine in the 11th century, entrusted by the Duke of Burgundy to Tescelin le Roux, father of the future Saint Bernard. Saint Bernard was born in what is now the large tower. A village emerged at the foot of the butte to serve the castle. The church of Saint-Ambrosinien, beside the château, would become the Église Saint-Bernard in the 19th century. In 1376 the villagers brought stone to rebuild this church. The church was again remodelled in the 15th and 16th centuries, and took its present aspect.

In the 17th century the reformed community of the order of Cîteaux, the congregation of the Feuillants, acquired the birthplace of Saint Bernard. The château was converted into a royal monastery and decorated using donations from King Louis XIII (1601–43) and Anne of Austria (1601–66). During the French Revolution (1789–99) ecclesiastical property was confiscated and sold by the state. The monastery of the Feuillants was destroyed. The land was purchased by winegrowers.

In the later 19th century the Congregation of the Most Holy Redeemer redeemed part of the property of the Feuillants, and transformed it into a wooded park with paths that converge on a cave of Lourdes, created artificially using features of the terrain, Pilgrimages to Saint Bernard's birthplace were resumed in 1873. The park was open only for religious processions. The birthplace was restored and transformed from 1881 to 1897. The architect Paul Selmersheim of the commission for historic monuments participated in the restoration. This gave the building its present appearance. The site was registered as a monument historique (historical monument) on 21 March 1988.

== Buildings ==
The complex includes an old entrance tower, the Saint Bernard basilica, and the building that connects them, which includes 17th century chapels and a 19th-century gallery. The 17th century door comes from the former convent of the Feuillants in the park. Protected elements are the chapel, tower, gallery and door. The configuration of the castle has changed significantly since the birth of Saint Bernard over nine centuries ago, and the present remnants of fortifications are from the late Middle Ages. For the sake of the pilgrims, the 19th century restorers tried to give the birthplace of Saint Bernard the appearance of a medieval fortress. They raised the entrance tower higher, and added battlements. They also moved the curtain wall some distance from that described in the 15th century charter.

== Sources ==
- Le site Saint-Bernard, Ville de Fontaine-lès-Dijon
- L'Histoire de Fontaine (in French), Fontaine-lès-Dijon
- "Monuments historiques : Couvent et Basilique Saint-Bernard", Mérimée (in French), Ministère de la Culture
- Pavèse, Sigrid (2010), Le site Saint-Bernard a Fontaine-lès-Dijon (PDF) (in French), Les Amis du Vieux Fontaine
- SELMERSHEIM Antoine, Paul (in French), École nationale des chartes
