= Morienval =

- Commune
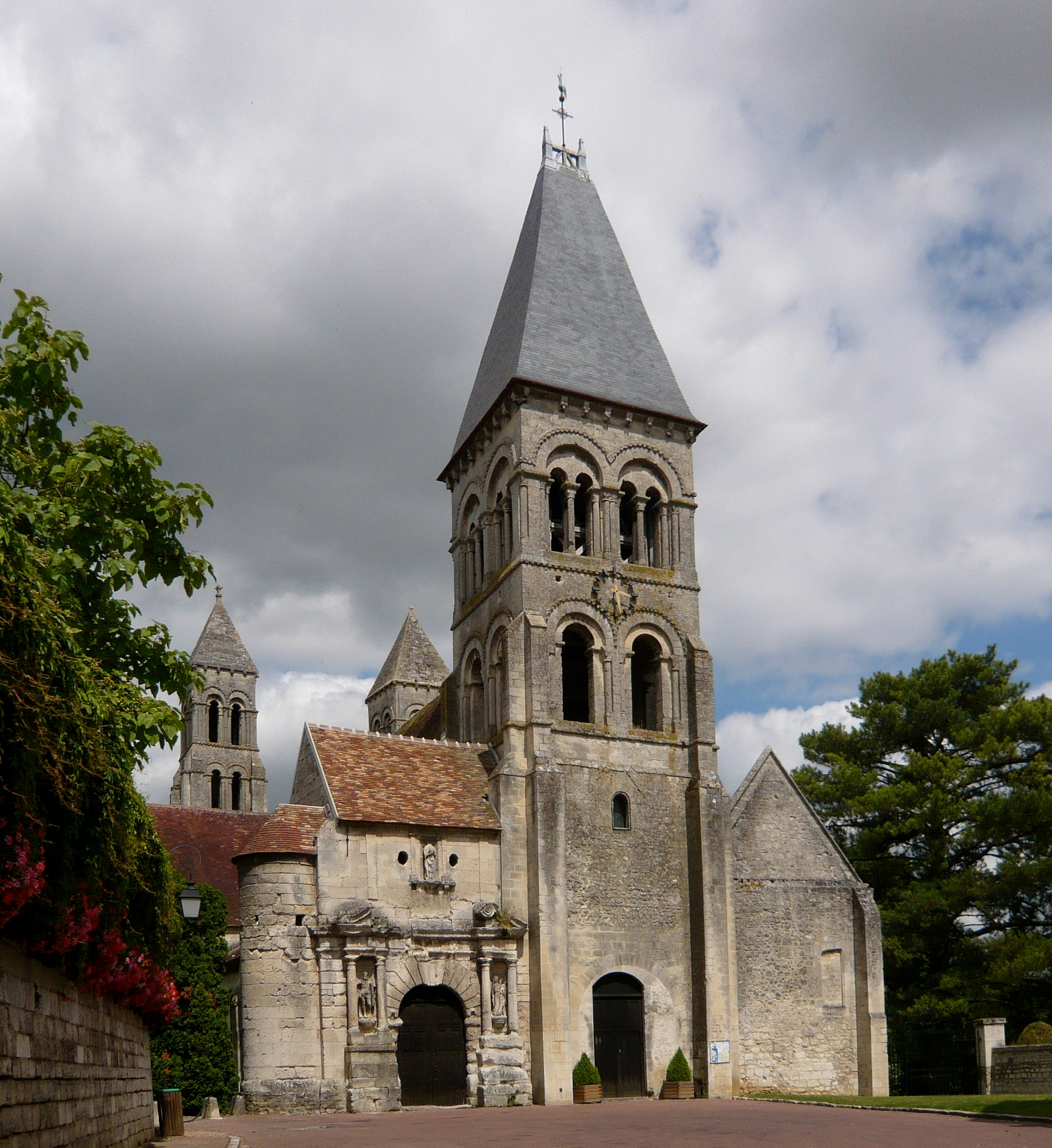
- The abbey of Morienval
- Location of Morienval
- Location within France Location within Hauts-de-France
- Coordinates: 49°17′48″N 2°55′12″E
- Country: France
- Region: Hauts-de-France
- Department: Oise
- Arrondissement: Senlis
- Canton: Crépy-en-Valois
- Intercommunality: Pays de Valois

Government
  - Mayor (2022–2026): Dorothée Rulence
- Area^{1}: 25.74 km^{2} (9.94 sq mi)
- Highest elevation: 171 m (561 ft)
- Lowest elevation: 52 m (171 ft)
- Population (2023): 1,035
  - Density: 40.21/km^{2} (104.1/sq mi)
- Time zone: UTC+01:00 (CET)
  - Summer (DST): UTC+02:00 (CEST)
- INSEE/Postal code: 60430 /60127
- ^{1} French Land Register data, which excludes lakes, ponds, glaciers > 1 km^{2} (0.386 sq mi or 247 acres) and river estuaries.

Morienval (French pronunciation: [mɔʁjɛ̃val]) is a commune in the Oise department in northern France.

== See also ==
- Communes of the Oise department
