= Jully, Yonne =

Jully
- Commune
- Location of Jully
- Location within France Location within Bourgogne-Franche-Comté
- Coordinates: 47°46′32″N 4°17′48″E
- Country: France
- Region: Bourgogne-Franche-Comté
- Department: Yonne
- Arrondissement: Avallon
- Canton: Tonnerrois

Government
  - Mayor (2020–2026): François Fleury
- Area^{1}: 19.76 km^{2} (7.63 sq mi)
- Highest elevation: 321 m (1,053 ft)
- Lowest elevation: 238 m (781 ft)
- Population (2023): 127
  - Density: 6.43/km^{2} (16.6/sq mi)
- Time zone: UTC+01:00 (CET)
  - Summer (DST): UTC+02:00 (CEST)
- INSEE/Postal code: 89210 /89160
- ^{1} French Land Register data, which excludes lakes, ponds, glaciers > 1 km^{2} (0.386 sq mi or 247 acres) and river estuaries.

Jully (French pronunciation: [ʒyli]) is a commune in the Yonne department in Bourgogne-Franche-Comté in north-central France.

== See also ==
- Communes of the Yonne department
