= Fontaine-lès-Dijon =

- Commune
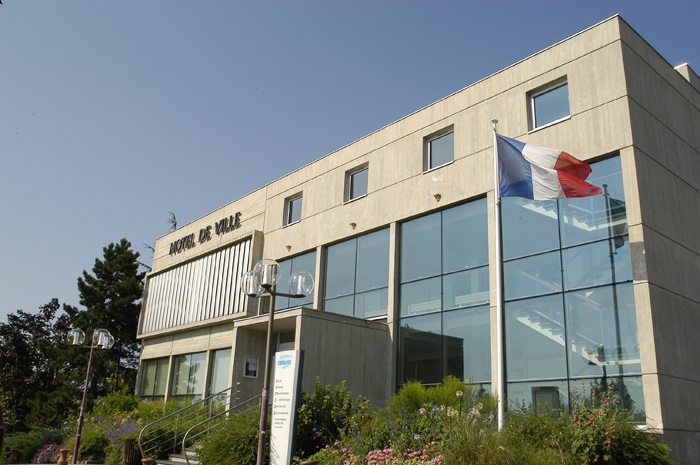
- The town hall in Fontaine-lès-Dijon

- Coat of arms
- Location of Fontaine-lès-Dijon
- Location within France Location within Bourgogne-Franche-Comté
- Coordinates: 47°20′36″N 5°01′14″E
- Country: France
- Region: Bourgogne-Franche-Comté
- Department: Côte-d'Or
- Arrondissement: Dijon
- Canton: Fontaine-lès-Dijon
- Intercommunality: Dijon Métropole

Government
  - Mayor (2020–2026): Patrick Chapuis
- Area^{1}: 4.49 km^{2} (1.73 sq mi)
- Highest elevation: 337 m (1,106 ft)
- Lowest elevation: 250 m (820 ft)
- Population (2023): 9,252
  - Density: 2,060/km^{2} (5,340/sq mi)
- Demonym(s): Fontainois (masculine); Fontainoise (feminine)
- Time zone: UTC+01:00 (CET)
  - Summer (DST): UTC+02:00 (CEST)
- INSEE/Postal code: 21278 /21121
- ^{1} French Land Register data, which excludes lakes, ponds, glaciers > 1 km^{2} (0.386 sq mi or 247 acres) and river estuaries.

Fontaine-lès-Dijon (French pronunciation: [fɔ̃tɛn lɛ diʒɔ̃]) is a commune in the Côte-d'Or department in eastern France. It is known for the Couvent et Basilique Saint-Bernard, a collection of buildings on the site of the birthplace of Saint Bernard of Clairvaux.

== Population ==
Historical population

Year	Pop.	±% p.a.
1793	447	—
1800	465	+0.57%
1806	443	−0.80%
1821	438	−0.08%
1831	469	+0.69%
1836	476	+0.30%
1841	434	−1.83%
1846	446	+0.55%
1851	454	+0.36%
1856	451	−0.13%
1861	457	+0.26%
1866	435	−0.98%
1872	430	−0.19%
1876	421	−0.53%
1881	424	+0.14%
1886	448	+1.11%
1891	488	+1.73%
1896	458	−1.26%
1901	448	−0.44%

Year	Pop.	±% p.a.
1906	440	−0.36%
1911	474	+1.50%
1921	548	+1.46%
1926	681	+4.44%
1931	845	+4.41%
1936	1,020	+3.84%
1946	1,255	+2.09%
1954	1,516	+2.39%
1962	2,687	+7.42%
1968	3,698	+5.47%
1975	5,010	+4.43%
1982	7,066	+5.03%
1990	7,856	+1.33%
1999	8,878	+1.37%
2007	8,957	+0.11%
2012	9,142	+0.41%
2017	8,888	−0.56%
2023	9,252	+0.67%

Source: EHESS and INSEE (1968-2023)

== See also ==
- Communes of the Côte-d'Or department
