= Palace of Fontainebleau =

French royal château

Château de Fontainebleau
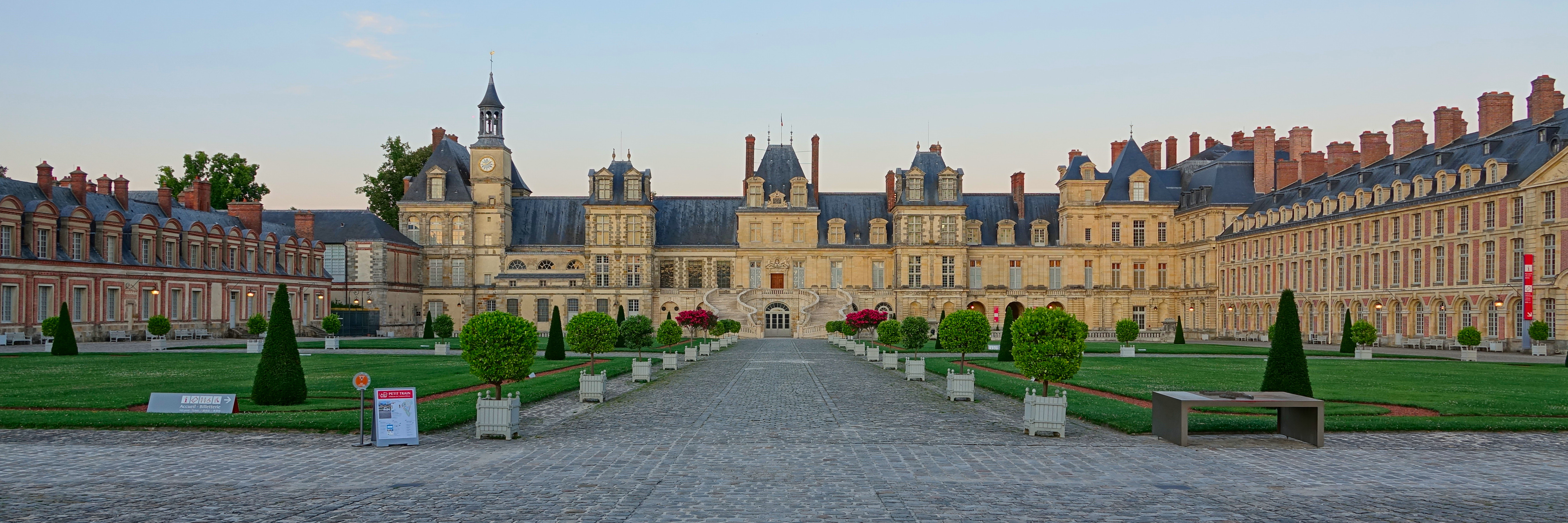
- Château de Fontainebleau
- Interactive fullscreen map
- 48°24′08″N 2°42′02″E
- Location: Fontainebleau, Seine-et-Marne, France

UNESCO World Heritage Site
- Official name: Palace and Park of Fontainebleau
- Type: Cultural
- Criteria: ii, vi
- Designated: 1981 (5th session)
- Reference no.: 160
- UNESCO Region: Europe and North America

Palace of Fontainebleau (/ˈfɒntɪnbloʊ/ FON-tin-bloh, US also /-bluː/ -bloo; French: Château de Fontainebleau [ʃɑto d(ə) fɔ̃tɛnblo]), located 55 kilometers (34 miles) southeast of the center of Paris, in the commune of Fontainebleau, is one of the largest French royal châteaux. It served as a hunting lodge and autumn residence for many of the French monarchs, including Louis VII, Francis I, Henry II, Louis-Philippe, Napoleon I, and Napoleon III. Though the monarchs only resided there for a few months of the year, they gradually transformed it into a genuine palace, filled with art and decoration. It became a national museum in 1927 and was designated a UNESCO World Heritage Site in 1981 for its unique architecture and historical importance.

== History ==
=== Name ===
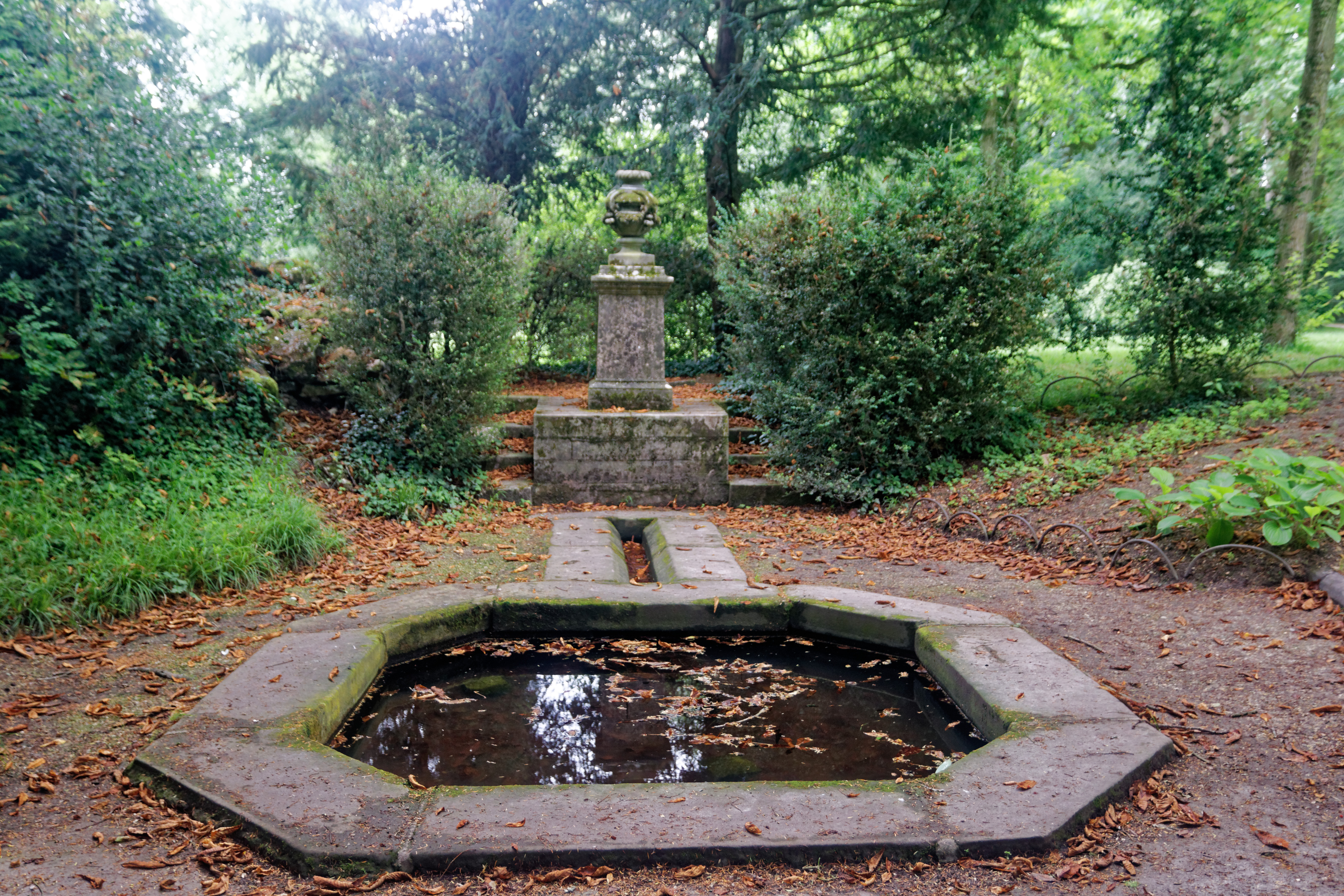
Fontaine Belle-Eau, the spring which gave its name to Fontainebleau

"Fontainebleau" took its name from the "Fontaine Belle-Eau", a natural fresh water spring located in the English garden not far from the château. In 1622 Henry Peacham wrote it “is the purest and fairest fountaine esteemed in the world, wherefore it was called Belle eauë.” In the 19th century the spring was rebuilt with an octagonal stone basin, as it appears today.

=== Hunting Lodge and castle (12th century) ===
The earliest reference to a royal residence at Fontainebleau dates to 1137 under King Louis VII the Younger, but it had probably been built earlier, during the reign of Philip I of France (1060 to 1108), when the Gâtinais region was annexed from the Duchy of Burgundy. It became a favorite autumn residence and hunting lodge of the kings of France because of the abundant game and many springs in the surrounding forest.

The first chateau was a square "donjon" or keep, a fortified tower surrounded by a wall. It was three stories high, and occupied an area of about fifty square meters. The lower walls were three meters wide while the upper walls were a meter wide, made of stone, had windows facing north and south and were topped by a wooden palisade. The King resided on the middle level. The original tower, rebuilt to fit the later styles, is still part of the Oval Court.

Louis VII built a chapel which was consecrated in 1169 by Thomas Becket, the English priest in exile in France because of his disagreements with King Henry II of England. He also sponsored the construction of a monastery of the Trinitarians, a mendicant order of monks, close to the castle

=== Francis I and The first School of Fontainbleau (1528–1547) ===
The modest medieval castle remained until the reign of Francis I of France (1494–1547). The King commissioned the architect Gilles Le Breton to build a new palace in the Renaissance style. Le Breton created the Cour Ovale, or oval courtyard, He preserved the original medieval keep on one side, but added a monumental new building, the Porte Dorée or Golden Gate, in the Italian Renaissance style, as the main entry of the palace. On the north side he built another building with a Renaissance stairway, the Portique de Serlio, which gave access the royal apartments.

Beginning in about 1528, Francis constructed the Galerie François I, which allowed him to pass directly from his apartments to the chapel of the Trinitarians. He brought the architect Sebastiano Serlio from Italy, and the Florentine painter Giovanni Battista di Jacopo, known as Rosso Fiorentino, to decorate the new gallery. Between 1533 and 1539 Rosso Fiorentino filled the gallery with murals glorifying the king, framed in stucco ornament in high relief, and lambris sculpted by the furniture maker Francesco Scibec da Carpi. Another Italian painter, Francesco Primaticcio from Bologna ("Primatice" to the French), joined later in the decoration of the gallery. Their elaborate mixture of painting and sculpture became known as the first School of Fontainebleau, which helped launch the French Renaissance. The emblem of Francis I, a salamander surrounded by flames, is found alongside each painting he commissioned in the Grand Gallery.

In about 1540, Francis began another major addition to the château. Using land on the east side of the château purchased from the order of the Trinitarians, he began to build a new square of buildings around a large courtyard. It was enclosed on the north by the wing of the Ministers, on the east by the wing of Ferrare, and on the south by a wing containing the new gallery of Ulysses. The château was surrounded by a new park in the style of the Italian Renaissance garden, with pavilions and the first grotto in France. Francesco Primaticcio created more monumental murals for the gallery of Ulysses.

=== Henry II and Catherine de Medici (1547–1570) ===
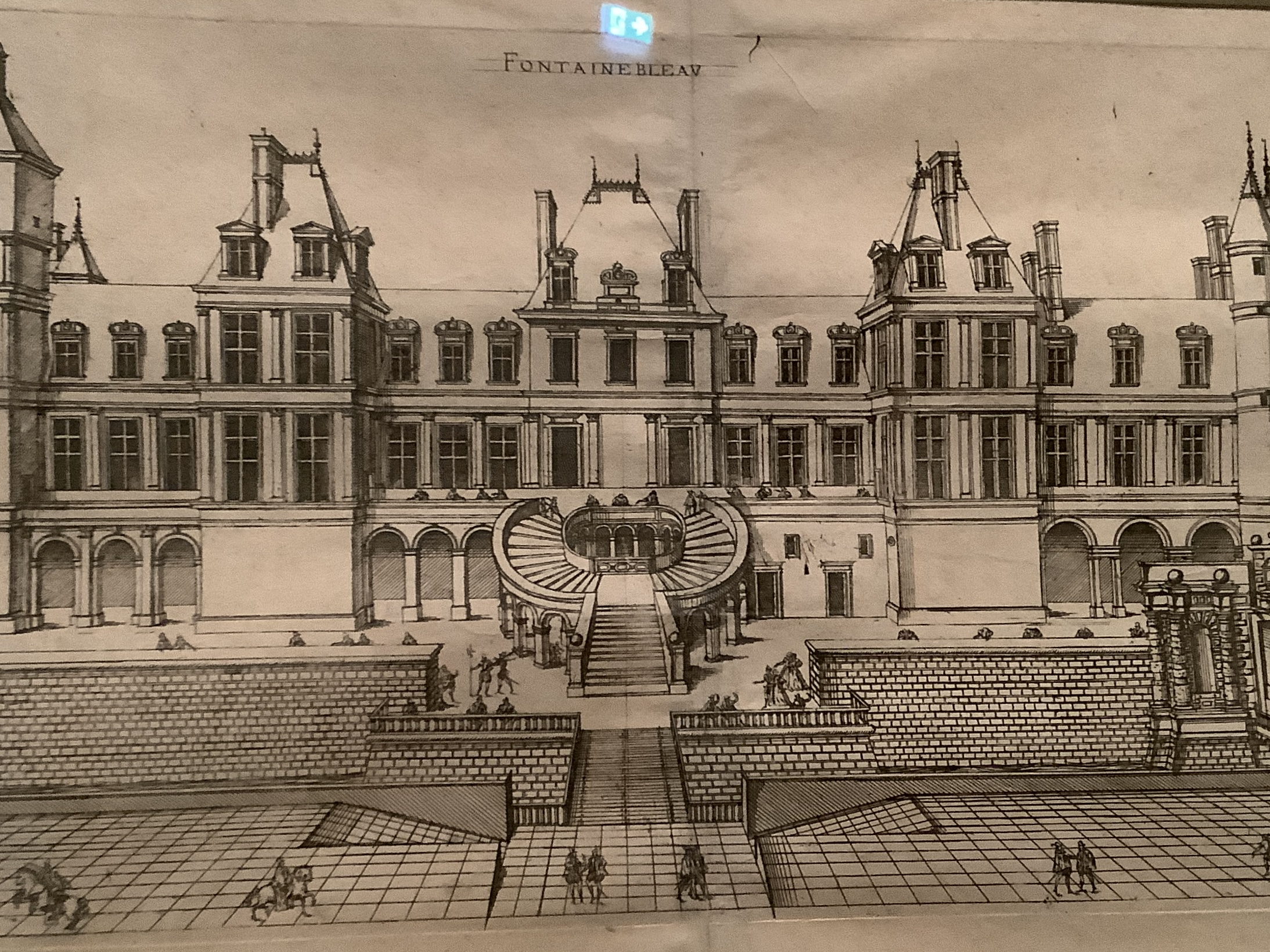
The original horseshoe staircase by Philibert de l'Orme in the Courtyard of Cheval Blanc (1559)

Following the death of Francis I, King Henry II continued to expand the chateau. The King and his wife, Catherine de' Medici, chose the architects Philibert de l'Orme and Jean Bullant to do the work. They extended the east wing of the lower court and decorated it with a horseshoe-shaped staircase, which was later enlarged, and became a symbol of the château.

Their major project was the Oval Court, which was designed to be the entrance to the new royal apartments. They transformed the loggia originally planned by Francis I into a Salle des Fêtes, or grand ballroom, with a coffered ceiling. Facing the courtyard of the fountain and the fish pond.

The decoration of the new ballroom featured murals by Francesco Primaticcio, surrounded by elaborate stucco sculpture. A new generation of artists joined the work, including the Mannerists painters Primaticcio and Niccolò dell'Abbate. It was also the birthplace of Francis II, Henry II's firstborn son.

Following the death of Henry II in a jousting accident, his widow, Catherine de' Medici, took over the project, which she carried out through the reigns of her three sons, Francis II, Charles IX, and Henry III. She named Primaticcio as the new superintendent of royal public works. He designed the section known today as the wing of the Belle Cheminée, noted for its elaborate chimneys and its two opposing stairways. In 1565, as a security measure due to the Wars of Religion, she also had a moat dug around the château to protect it against attack.

=== Henry IV (1570–1610) ===
King Henry IV made more additions to the château than any king since Francis I. He extended the oval court toward the west by building two pavilions, called Tiber and Luxembourg. Between 1601 and 1606, he remade all the façades around the courtyard, including that of the chapel of Saint-Saturnin, to give the architecture greater harmony. On the east side, he built a new monumental domed gateway, the Porte du Baptistère. Between 1606 and 1609, he built a new courtyard, the Cour des Offices or Quartier Henry IV, to provide a place for the kitchens and residences for court officials. Two new galleries, the Gallery of Diana and the Gallery of Deer, were built to enclose the old garden of Diana. He also added a large jeu de paume, or indoor tennis court, the largest such court existing in the world.

A second School of Fontainebleau group of painters and decorators went to work on the interiors. The architect Martin Fréminet created the ornate chapel of the Trinity, while the painters Ambroise Dubois and Toussaint Dubreuil created a series of heroic paintings for the salons. A new wing, named for its central building, La Belle Cheminée, was built next to the large fish pond.

Henry IV also devoted great attention to the park and gardens around the chateau. The garden of the Queen or garden of Diana, created by Catherine de' Medici, with the fountain of Diane in the center, was located on the north side of the palace. Henry IV's gardener, Claude Mollet, trained at Château d'Anet, created a large parterre of flower beds, decorated with ancient statues and separated by paths into large squares. The fountain of Diana and the grotto were made by Tommaso Francini, who may also have designed the Medici Fountain in the Luxembourg Garden for Marie de' Medici. On the south side, Henry created a park, planted with pines, elms and fruit trees, and laid out a grand canal 1200 meters long, sixty years before Louis XIV built his own grand canal at Versailles.

=== Louis XIII to Louis XVI (17th-18th century) ===
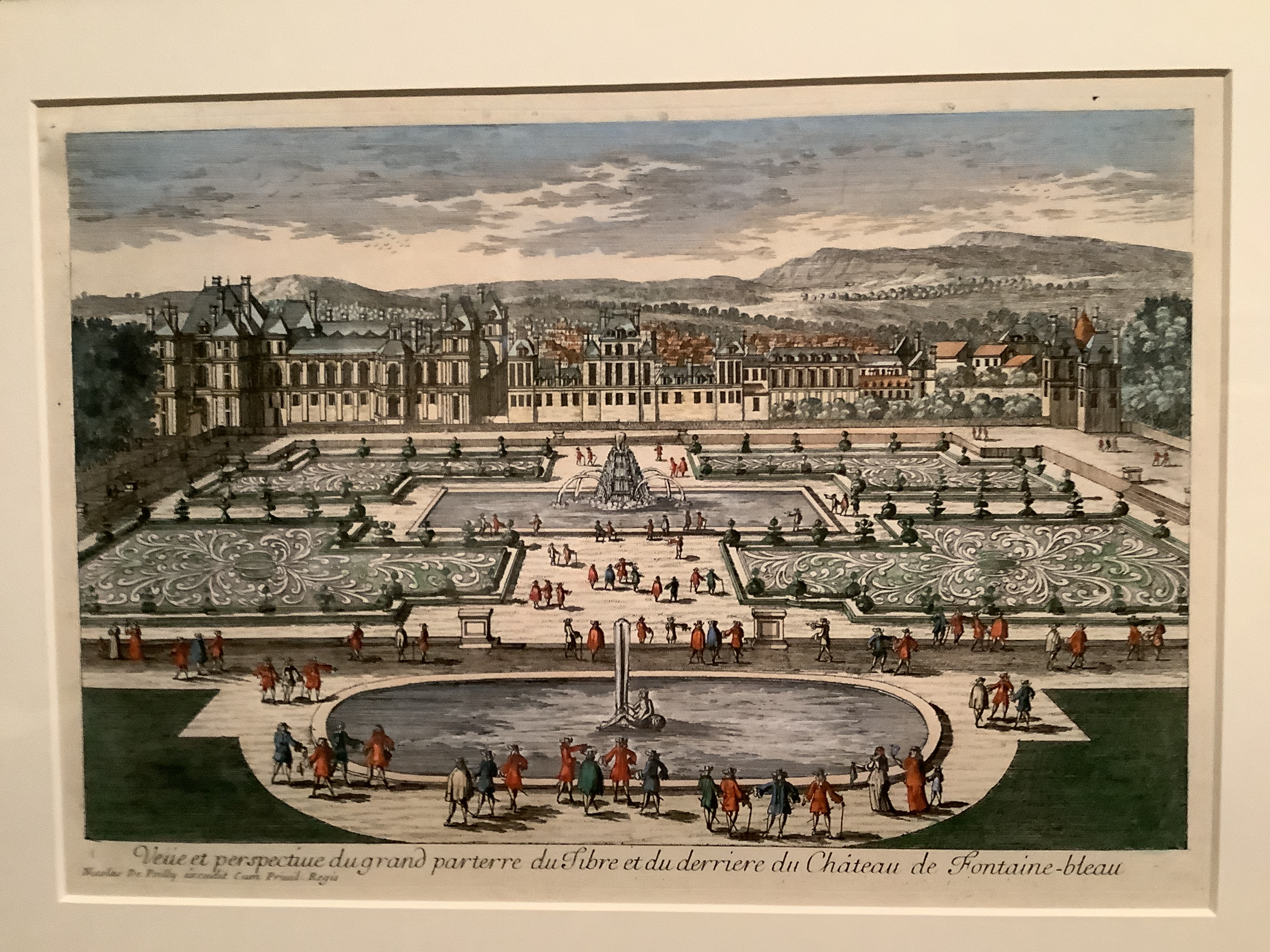
Fountain and garden behind the château (about 1680)

Louis XIV hunting near the Palace of Fontainebleau. Painting by Pierre-Denis Martin (1718-1723)

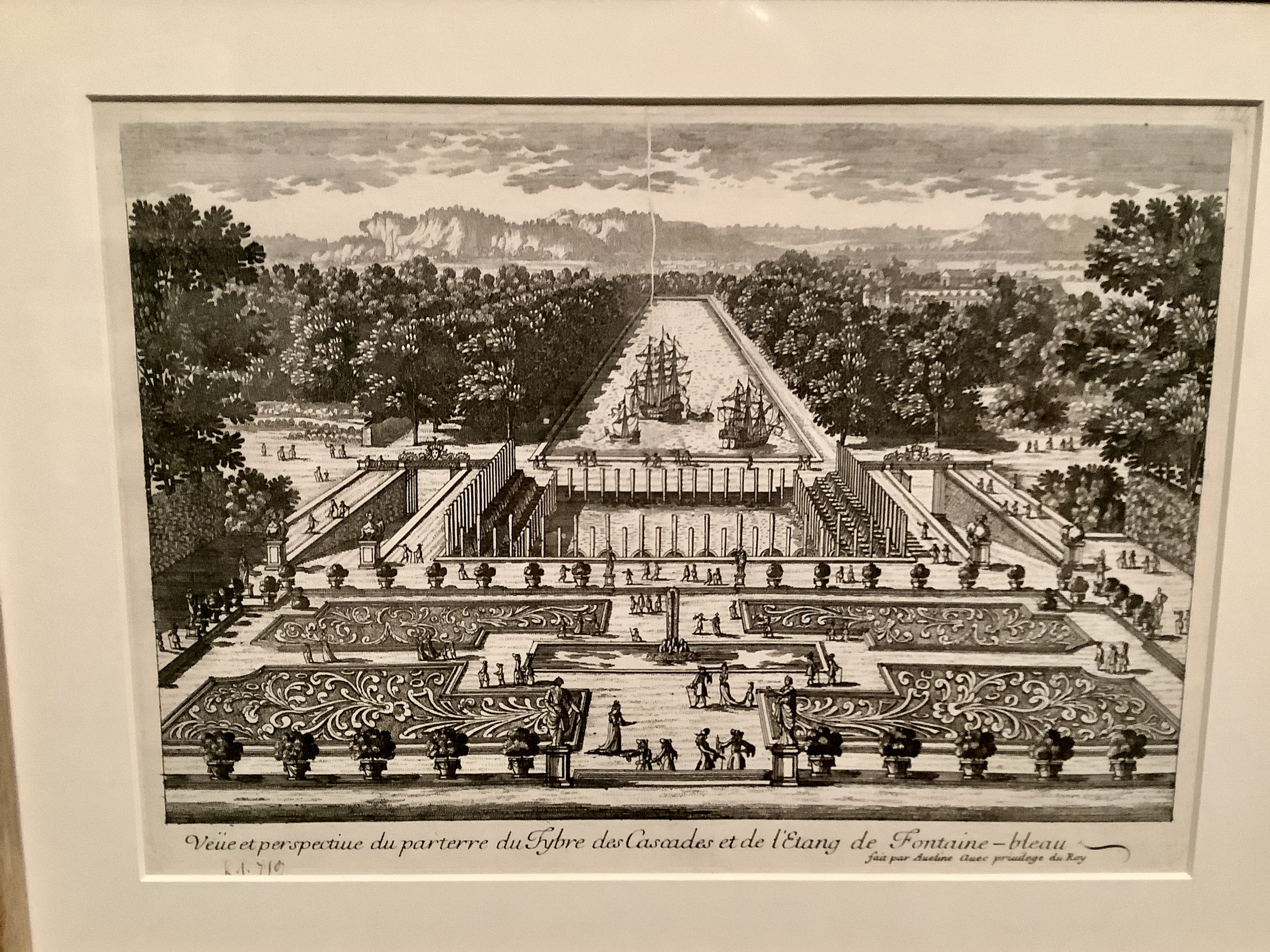
Court of Fountains (1755)

King Louis XIII, who had been born and baptized in the château, continued the works begun by his father. He completed the decoration of the chapel of the Trinity, and assigned the court architect Jean Androuet du Cerceau to reconstruct the horseshoe stairway earlier designed by Philibert Delorme on the courtyard that had become known as the Cour de Cheval Blanc. After his death, his widow, Anne of Austria, redecorated the apartments within the Wing of the Queen Mothers (Aile des Reines Mères) next to the Court of the Fountain, designed by Primatrice.

King Louis XIV spent more days at Fontainebleau than any other monarch; he liked to hunt there every year at the end of summer and the beginning of autumn. He made few changes to the exterior of the château, but did build a new apartment for his companion Madame de Maintenon, furnished it with some major works of André-Charles Boulle and demolished the old apartments of the baths under the Gallery of Francis I to create new apartments for the royal princes, and he made some modifications to the apartments of the King. The architect Jules Hardouin-Mansart built a new wing alongside the Gallery of Deer and the Gallery of Diana to provide more living space for the Court. He did make major changes in the park and gardens; he commissioned André Le Nôtre and Louis Le Vau to redesign the large parterre into a French formal garden. He removed the hanging garden which Henry IV had built next to the large fish pond, and instead built a pavilion, designed by Le Vau, on a small island in the center of the pond.

Louis XIV welcomed many foreign guests there, including the former Queen Christina of Sweden, who had just abdicated her crown. While a guest in the château on 10 November 1657, Christina suspected her Master of the Horse and reputed lover, the Marchese Gian Rinaldo Monaldeschi, of betraying her secrets to her enemies. Her servants chased him through the halls of the château and stabbed him to death. Louis XIV came to see her at the château, did not mention the murder, and allowed her to continue her travels.

On May 19–20, 1717, during the Regency following the death of Louis XIV, the Russian Tsar Peter the Great was a guest at Fontainebleau. A hunt for stags was organized for him, and a banquet. Officially the visit was a great success, but in the memoirs published later by members of the delegation, it appears that Peter disliked the French style of hunting, and that he found the château too small, compared with the other royal French residences. The routine of Fontainebleau also did not suit his tastes; he preferred beer to wine (and brought his own supply with him) and he liked to get up early, unlike the French Court.

The renovation projects of Louis XV were more ambitious than those of Louis XIV. To create more lodging for his enormous number of courtiers, in 1737–38 the King built a new courtyard, called the Cour de la Conciergerie or the Cour des Princes, to the east of the Gallery of Deer. On the Cour du Cheval Blanc, the wing of the Gallery of Ulysses was torn down and gradually replaced by a new brick and stone building, built in stages in 1738–1741 and 1773–74, extending west toward the Pavilion and grotto of the pines.

Between 1750 and 1754, the King commissioned the architect Ange-Jacques Gabriel, who had designed the Place de la Concorde and Petit Trianon to build a new wing along the Cour de la Fontaine and the carp pond. The old Pavilion des Poeles was demolished and replaced by the Gros Pavilion, built of cream-colored stone. Lavish new apartments were created inside this building for the King and the Queen. The new meeting room for the Royal Council was decorated by the leading painters of the day, including François Boucher, Charles-André van Loo, Jean-Baptiste Marie Pierre and Alexis Peyrotte. A magnificent small theater was created on the first floor of the wing of the Belle Cheminée.

King Louis XVI also made additions to the château to create more space for his courtiers. A new building was constructed alongside the Gallery of Francis I; it created a large new apartment on the first floor, and a number of small apartments on the ground floor, but also blocked the windows on the north side of the Gallery of Francis I. The apartments of Queen Marie Antoinette were redone, a Turkish-style salon was created for her in 1777, a room for games in 1786–1787, and a boudoir in the arabesque style. Louis XVI and Marie Antoinette made their last visit to Fontainebleau in 1786, on the eve of the French Revolution.

=== The Revolution and the First Empire ===
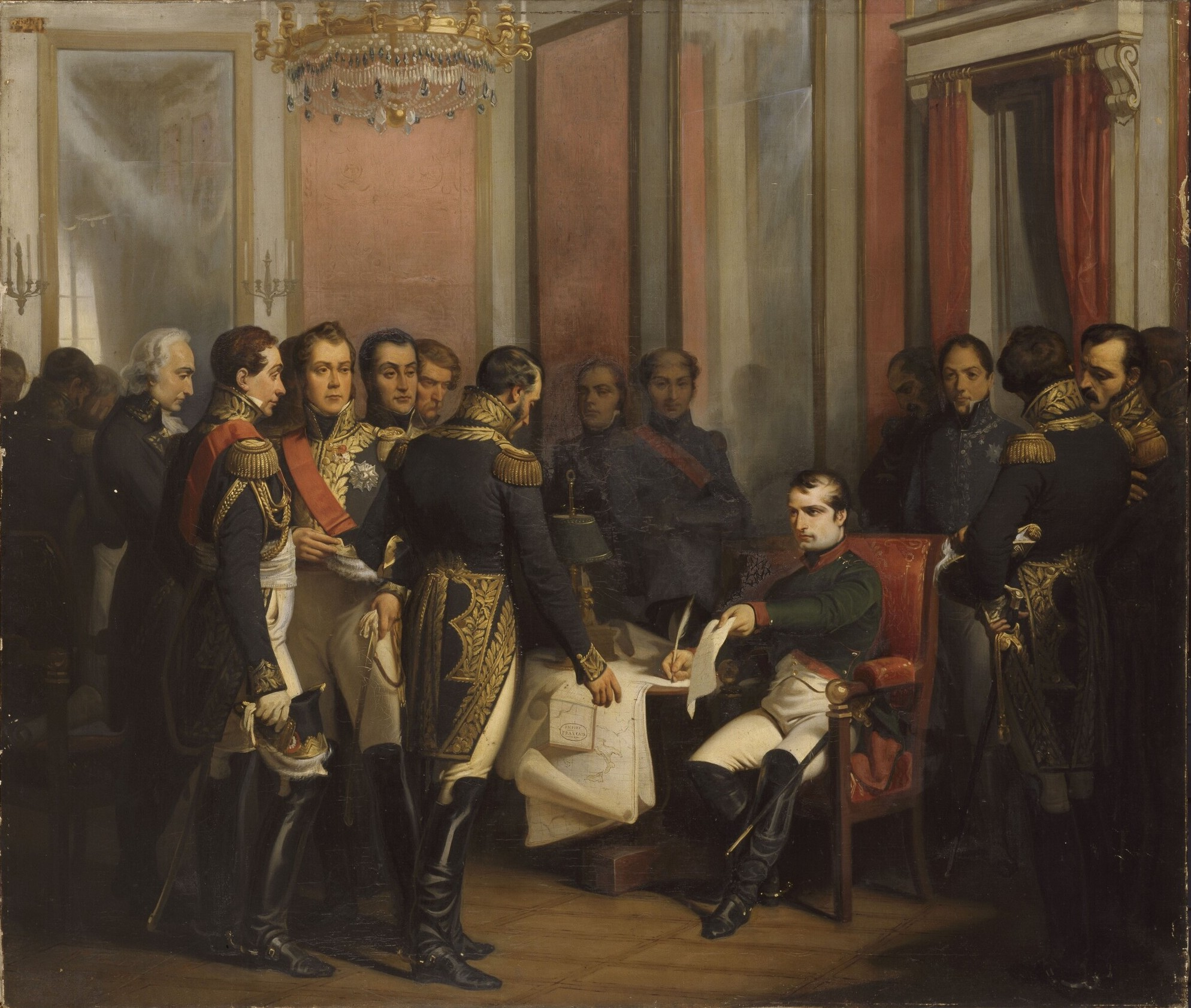
Napoleon Signing His Abdication at Fontainebleau by François Bouchot. Napoleon signs his abdication at Fontainebleau on 4 April 1814

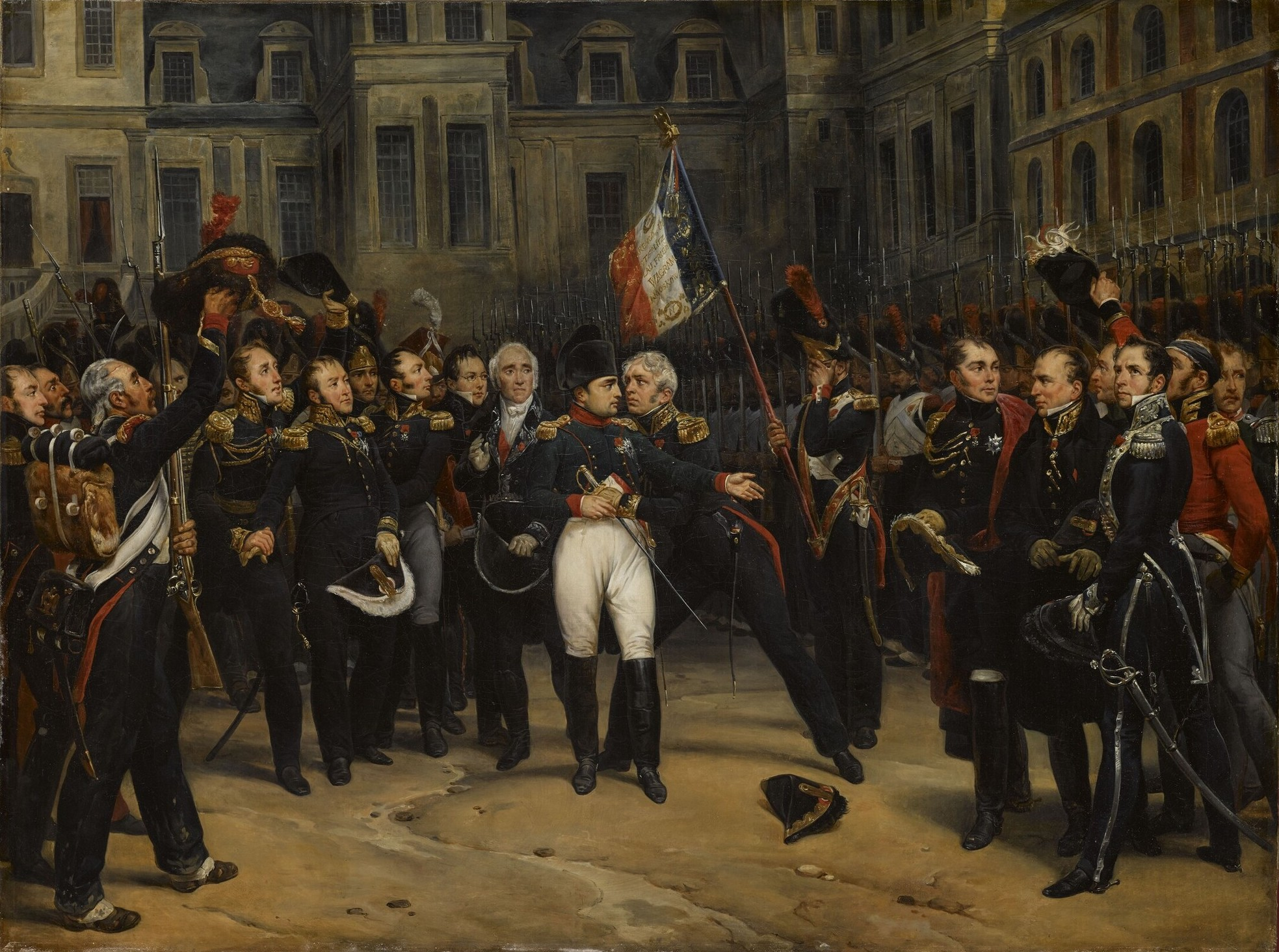
Napoleon saying farewell to his Old Guard in the Courtyard of Honor (20 April 1814)

During the French Revolution the château was far from the turbulence of Paris, and did not suffer any significant damage, but all the furniture was later sold at auction. The buildings were occupied by the Central School of the Department of Seine-et-Marne, until 1803, when Napoleon installed a military school there. He chose Fontainebleau as the site of his historic 1804 meeting with Pope Pius VII, who had travelled from Rome to crown Napoleon emperor. Apartments were refurnished and decorated for the Emperor and Empress in the new Empire style. The Cour du Cheval Blanc was renamed the Cour d'Honneur, or Courtyard of Honor. One wing facing the courtyard, the Aile de Ferrare, was torn down and replaced with an ornamental iron fence and gate, making the façade of the palace visible. The gardens of Diane and the gardens of the Pines were replanted and turned into an English landscape garden by the landscape designer Maximilien Joseph Hurtault.

Napoleon's visits to Fontainebleau were not frequent, because he was occupied so much of the time with military campaigns. Between 1812 and 1814, the château served as a very elegant prison for Pope Pius VII. On 5 November 1810, the chapel of the château was used for the baptism of Napoleon's nephew, the future Napoleon III, with Napoleon serving as his godfather, and the Empress Marie-Louise as his godmother.

Napoleon spent the last days of his reign at Fontainebleau, before abdicating there on 4 April 1814, under pressure from his Marshals, Ney, Berthier, and Lefebvre. On 20 April, after surviving a suicide attempt, he gave an emotional farewell to the soldiers of the Old Guard, assembled in the Court of Honor. Later, during the Hundred Days, he stopped there on 20 March 1815.

In his memoirs, written while in exile on Saint Helena, he recalled his time at Fontainebleau; "...the true residence of kings, the house of the centuries. Perhaps it was not a rigorously architectural palace, but it was certainly a place of residence well thought out and perfectly suitable. It was certainly the most comfortable and happily situated palace in Europe."

=== Restoration and the reign of Louis-Philippe (1815–1848) ===
Following the restoration of the monarchy, Kings Louis XVIII and Charles X each stayed at Fontainebleau, but neither made any major changes to the palace. Louis-Philippe I was more active, both restoring some rooms and redecorating others in the style of his period. The Hall of the Guards and Gallery of Plates were redecorated in a Neo-Renaissance style, while the Hall of Columns, under the ballroom, was remade in a neoclassical style. He added new stained glass windows, made by the Royal Manufactory of Sèvres.

=== The Second Empire of Napoleon III ===
Emperor Napoleon III, who had been baptized at Fontainebleau, resumed the custom of long stays at Fontainebleau, particularly during the summer. Many of the historic rooms, such as the Gallery of Deer, were restored to something like their original appearance, while the private apartments were redecorated to suit the tastes of the Emperor and Empress. Numerous guest apartments were squeezed into unused spaces of the buildings. The old theater of the palace, built in the 18th century, was destroyed by a fire in the wing of the Belle Cheminée 1856. Between 1854 and 1857 the architect Hector Lefuel built a new theater in the Louis XVI style, where famous actors from the theatres of Paris performed portions of plays for the guests of the Emperor.

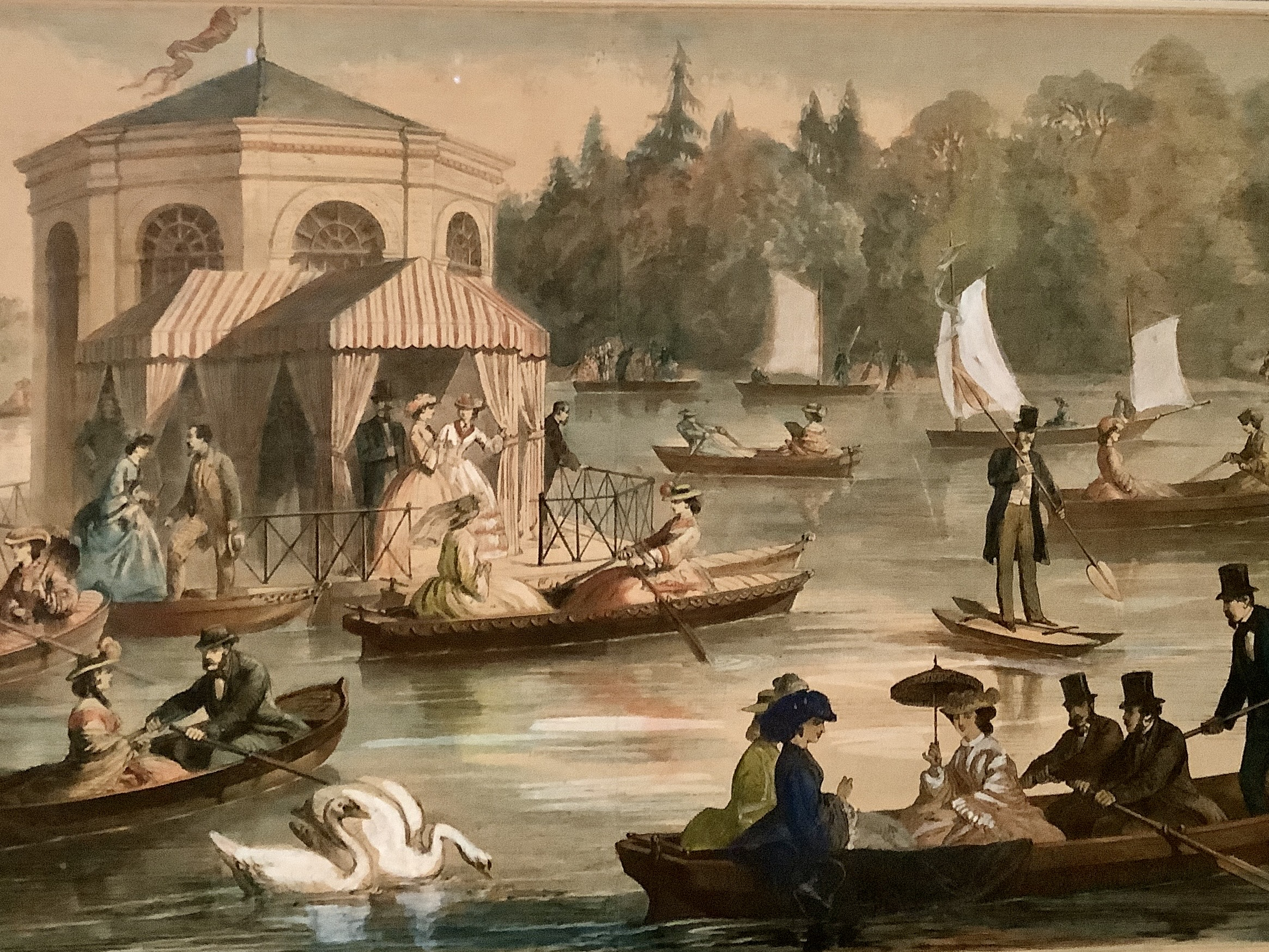
Guests of Napoleon III enjoying the carp pond (1862)

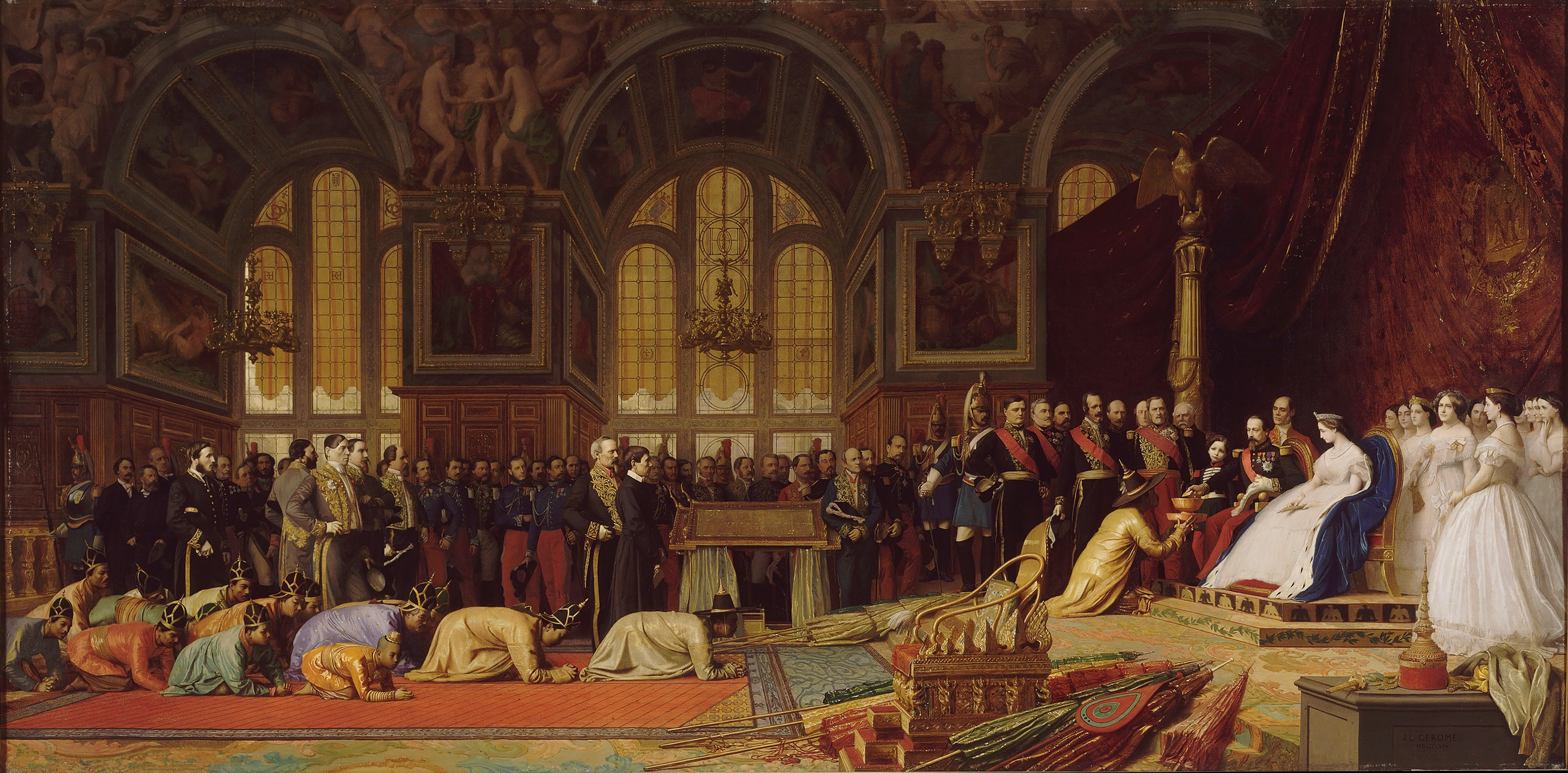
Napoleon III receiving a delegation from the King of Siam in the ballroom (1864)

On the ground floor of the Gros Pavilion, the Empress Eugénie built a small but rich museum, containing gifts from the King of Siam in 1861, and works of art taken during the pillage of the Summer Palace in Beijing. It also featured paintings by contemporary artists, including Franz Xaver Winterhalter, and the sculptor Charles Henri Joseph Cordier. Close by, in the Louis XV wing, the Emperor established his office, and the Empress made her Salon of Lacquer. These were the last rooms created by the royal residents of Fontainebleau. In 1870, during the Franco-Prussian War, the Second Empire fell, and the château was closed.

=== Third Republic to the present day ===
During the Franco-Prussian War, the palace was occupied by the Prussian Army on 17 September 1870, and briefly used as an army headquarters by Frederick Charles of Prussia from March 1871. Following the war, two of the buildings became the home of the School of Applied Artillery, which had been forced to leave Alsace when the province was annexed by Germany. It was occasionally used as a residence by the presidents of the Third Republic, and to welcome state guests including King Alexander I of Serbia (1891), King George I of Greece (1892) Leopold II of Belgium (1895) and King Alfonso XIII of Spain (1913). It also received a visit by the last survivor of its royal residents, the Empress Eugénie, on 26 June 1920.

The façades the major buildings received their first protection by classification as historic monuments on 20 August 1913. In 1923, following World War I, it became home of the Écoles d'Art Américaines, schools of art and music, which still exist today. In 1927 it became a national museum. Between the wars the upper floors of the wing of the Belle Cheminée, burned in 1856, were rebuilt by a grant from the Rockefeller Foundation.

During World War II, it was occupied by the Germans on 16 June 1940, and occupied until 10 November, and again from 15 May to the end of October 1941. Following the war, part of the château became a headquarters of the Western Union and later NATO's Allied Forces Central Europe/Supreme Headquarters Allied Powers Europe, until 1966.

The general restoration of the château took place between 1964 and 1968 under President Charles de Gaulle and his Minister of Culture, Andre Malraux. It was classified as a UNESCO World Heritage Site in 1981. In 2006, the Ministry of Culture purchased the royal stables, and began their restoration.

Beginning in 2007, restoration began of the theater of the château, created by Napoleon III during the Second Empire. The project was funded by the government of Abu Dhabi, and in exchange the theater was renamed for Sheikh Khalifa bin Zayed Al Nahyan. It was inaugurated on 30 April 2014.

On 1 March 2015, the Chinese Museum of the château was robbed by professional thieves. They broke in at about six in the morning, and, despite alarms and video cameras, in seven minutes stole about fifteen of the most valuable objects in the collection, including the replica of the crown of Siam given by the Siamese government to Napoleon III, a Tibetan mandala, and an enamel chimera from the reign of the Qianlong Emperor (1736–1795).

== Architecture ==
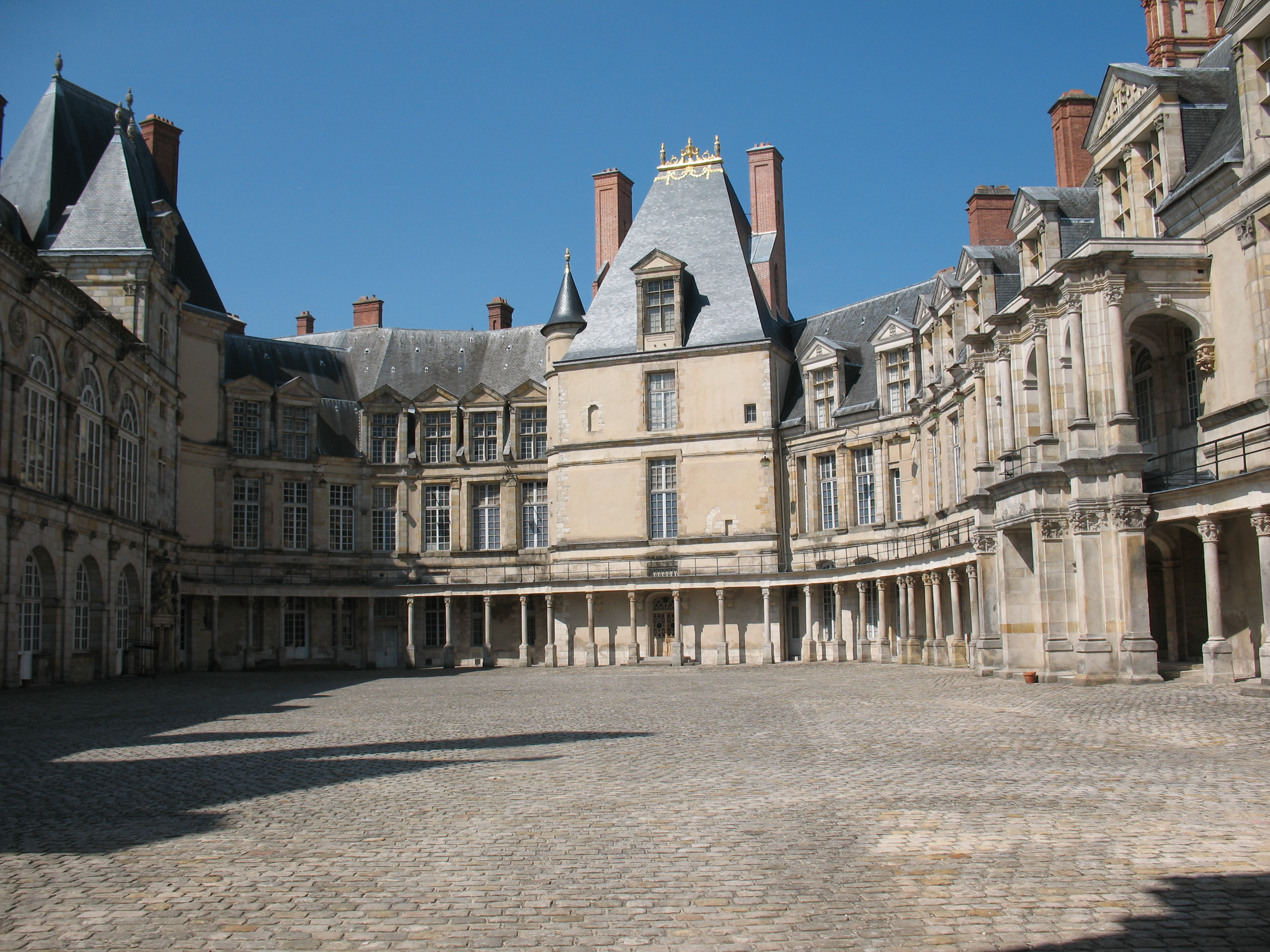
Keep or tower of the Medieval château on the Oval Courtyard (12th century)

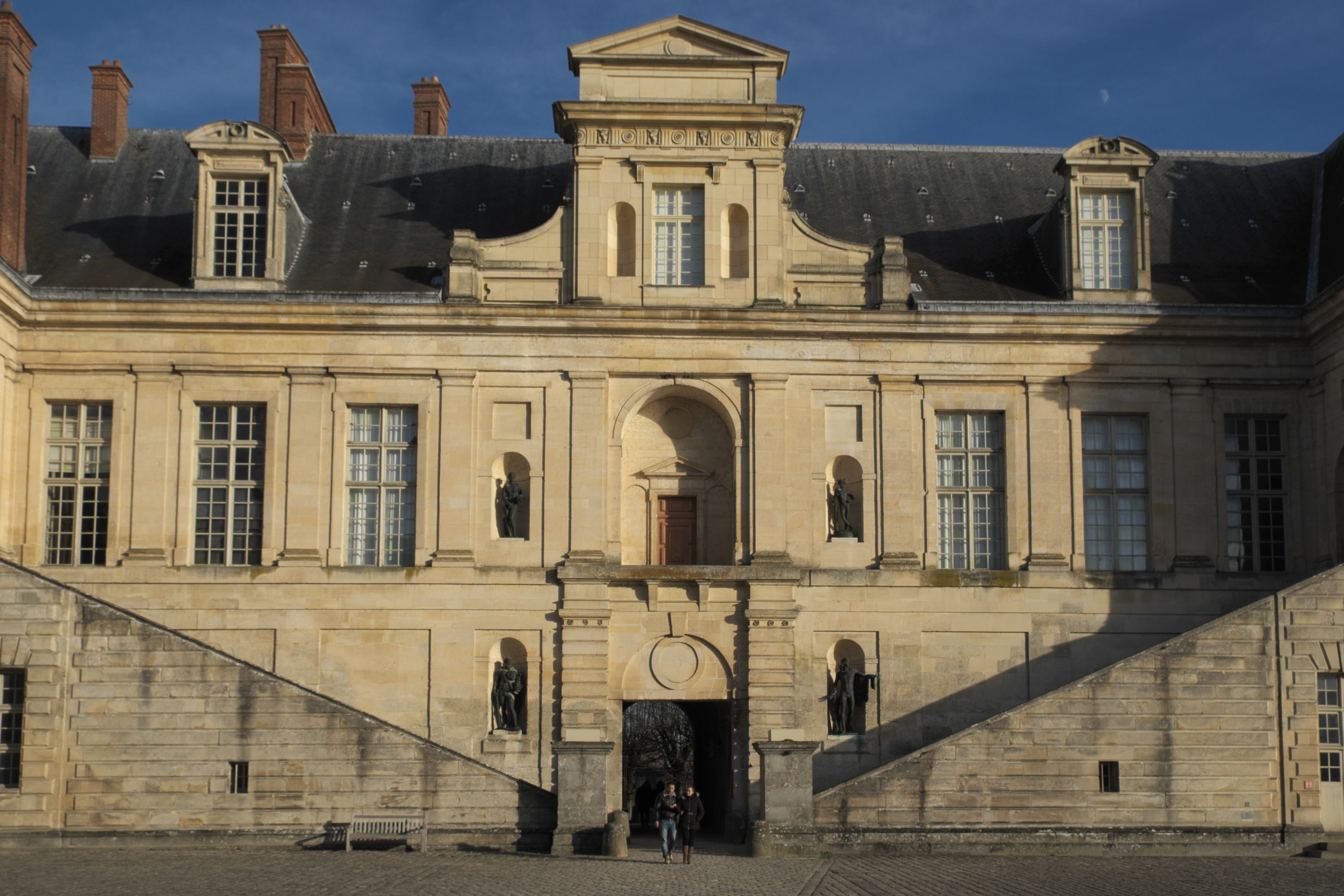
Fine Fireplace Wing, built by Primaticcio for Catherine de Medici (1565-1570)

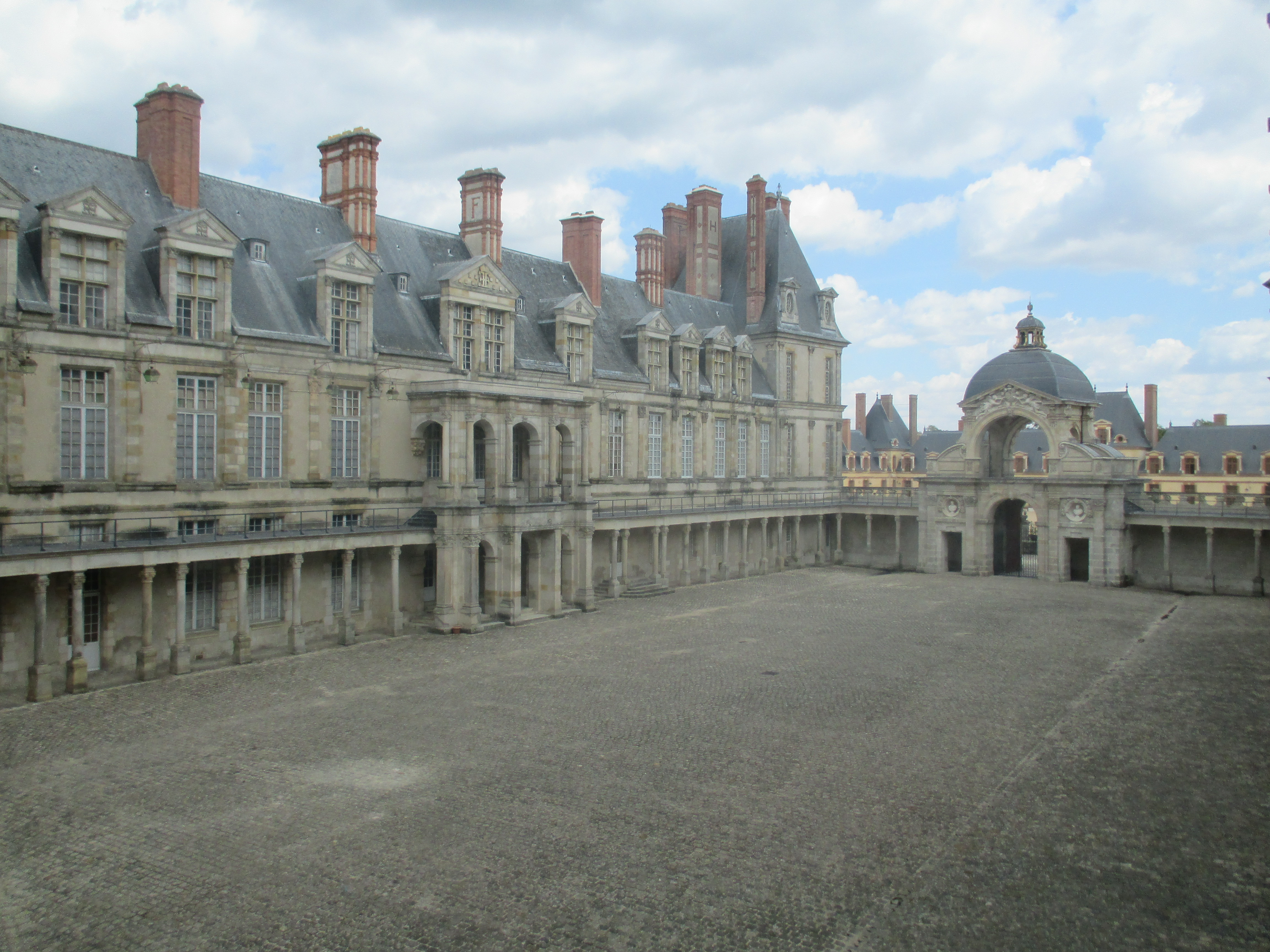
Royal residence of Henry IV on the Oval Courtyard (1601-1606)

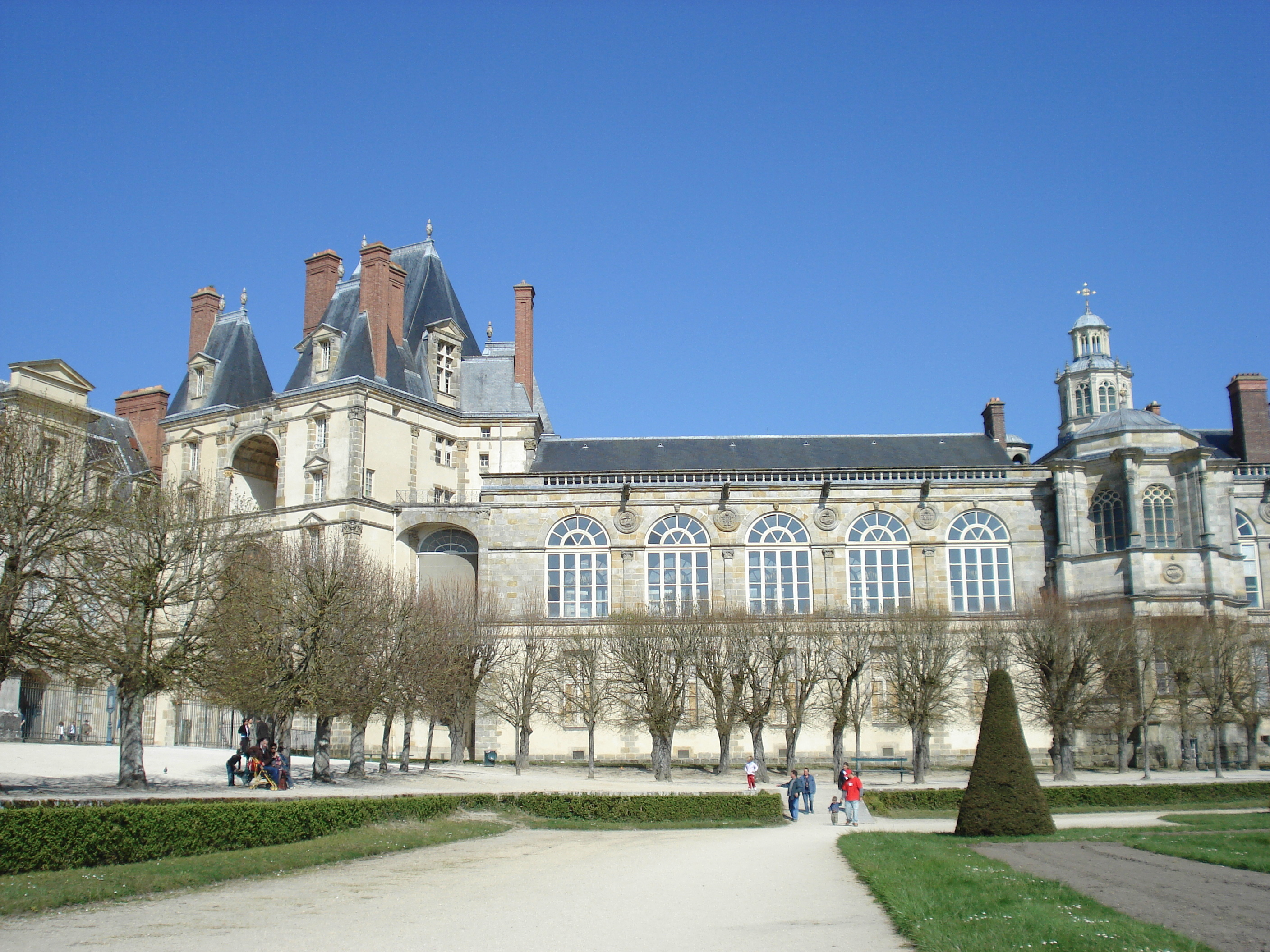
"Golden Gate" portal to the oval courtyard (left) and Saturnin Chapel (right), rebuilt with new façade by Henry IV

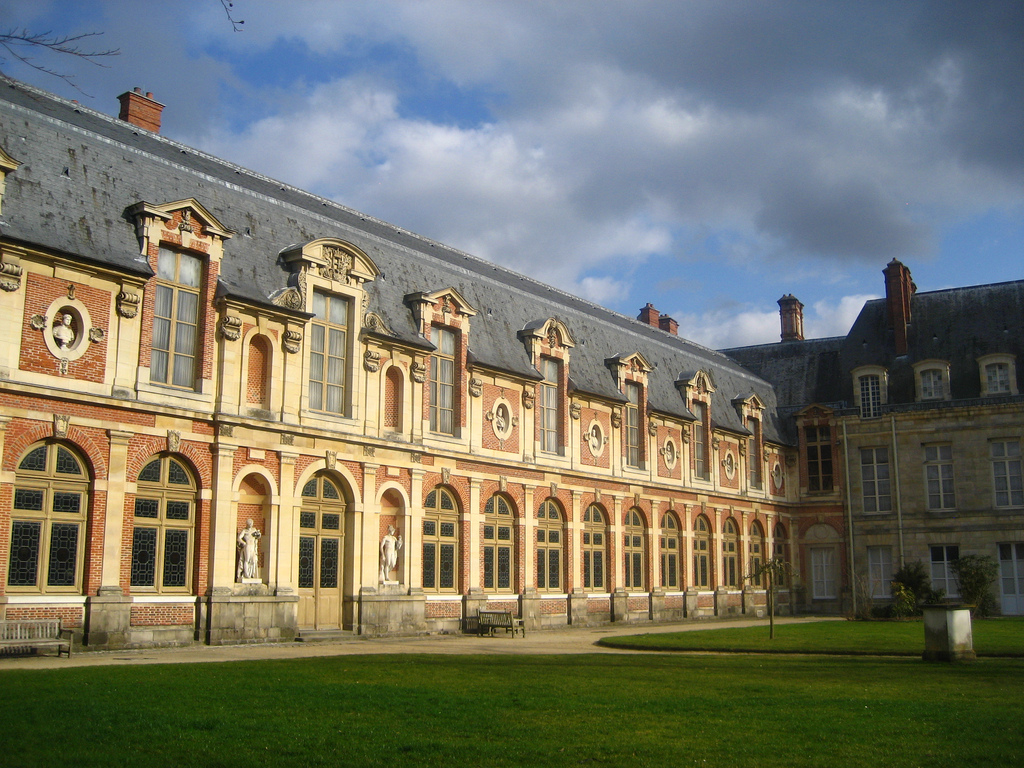
Stag's Callery and Diana's gallery, enclosed the Garden of Diana, between 1601 and 1606

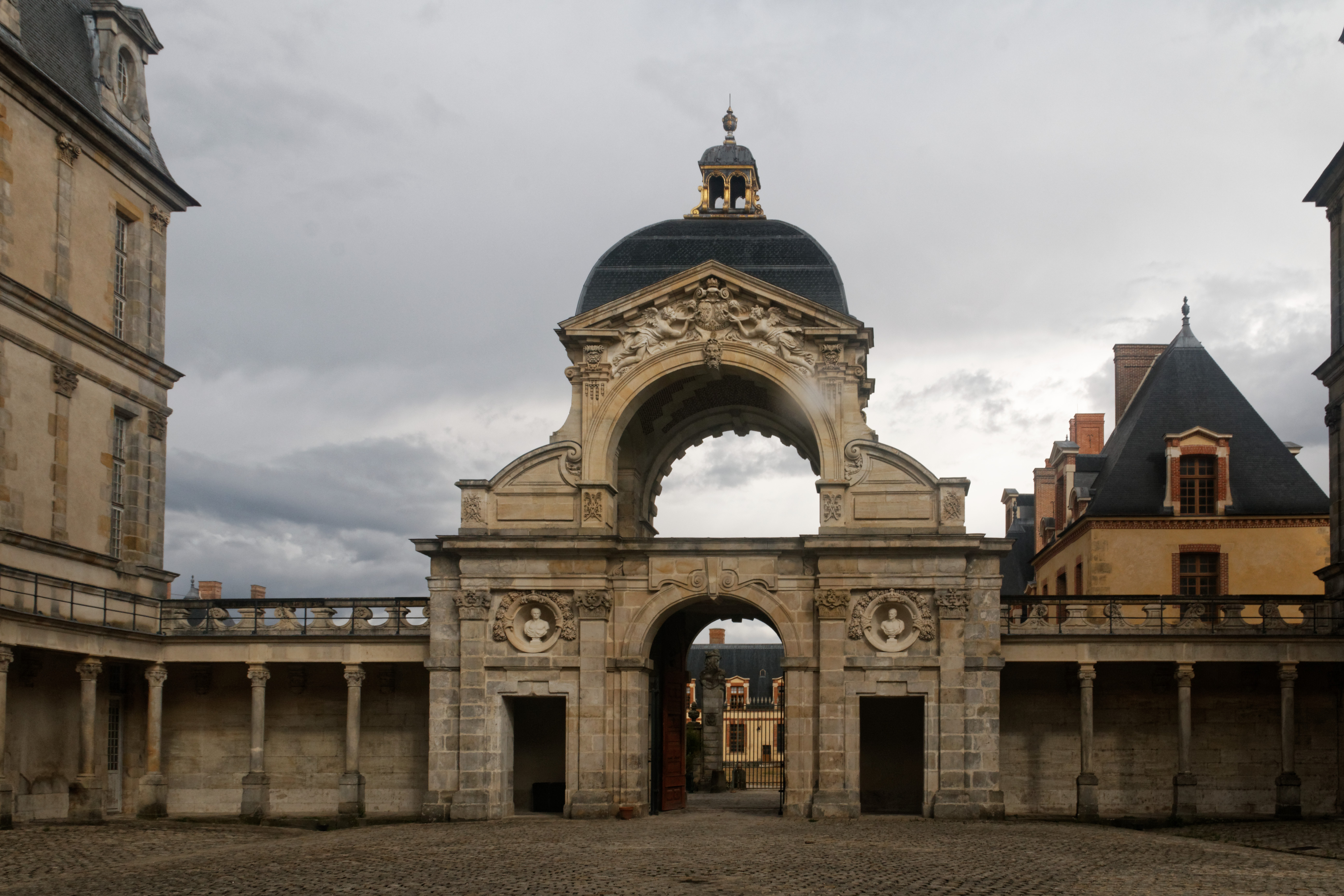
Oval Courtyard and the Portal of the Baptistry (1601-1606)

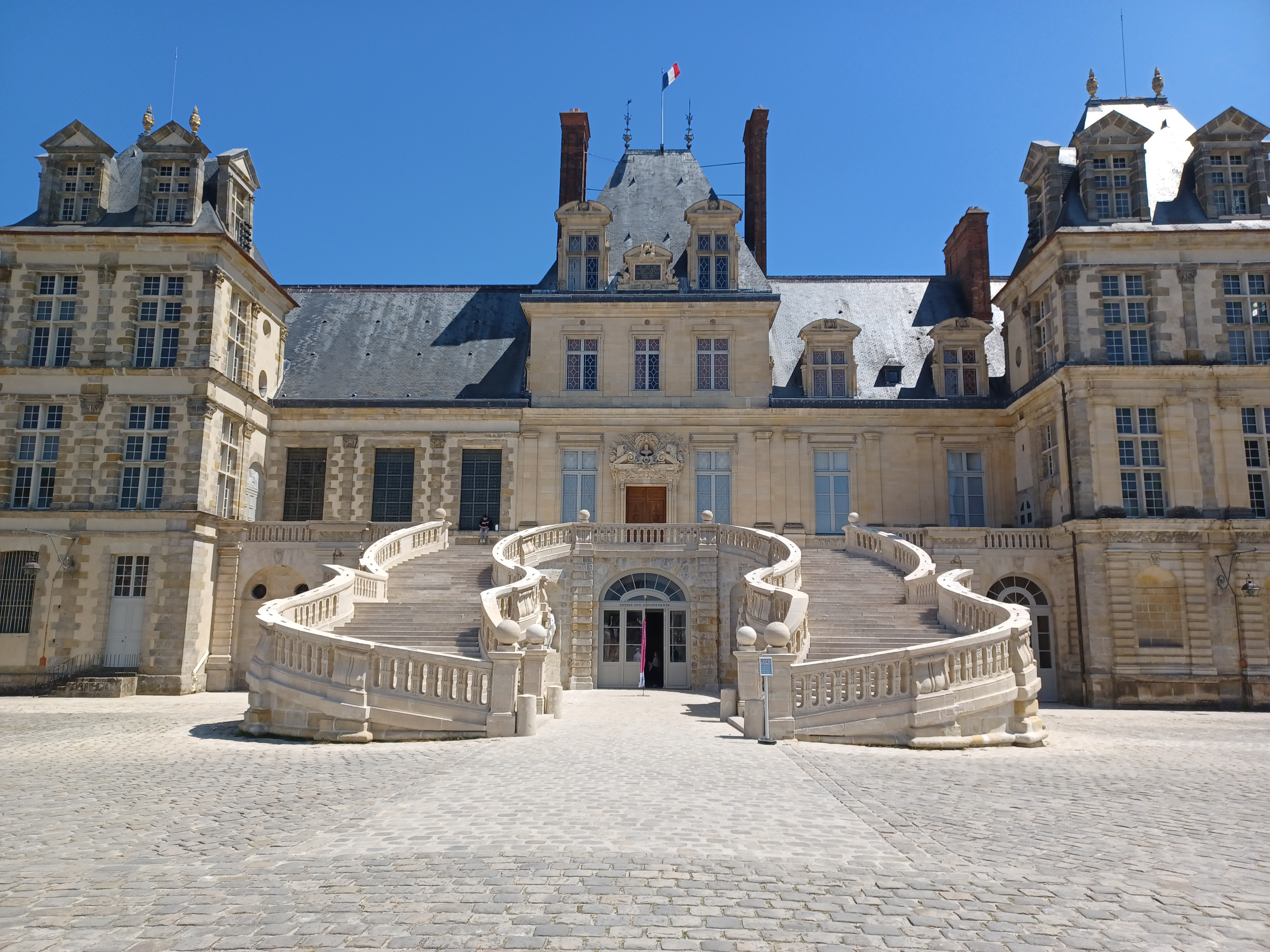
The enlarged Horseshoe stairway (1602)

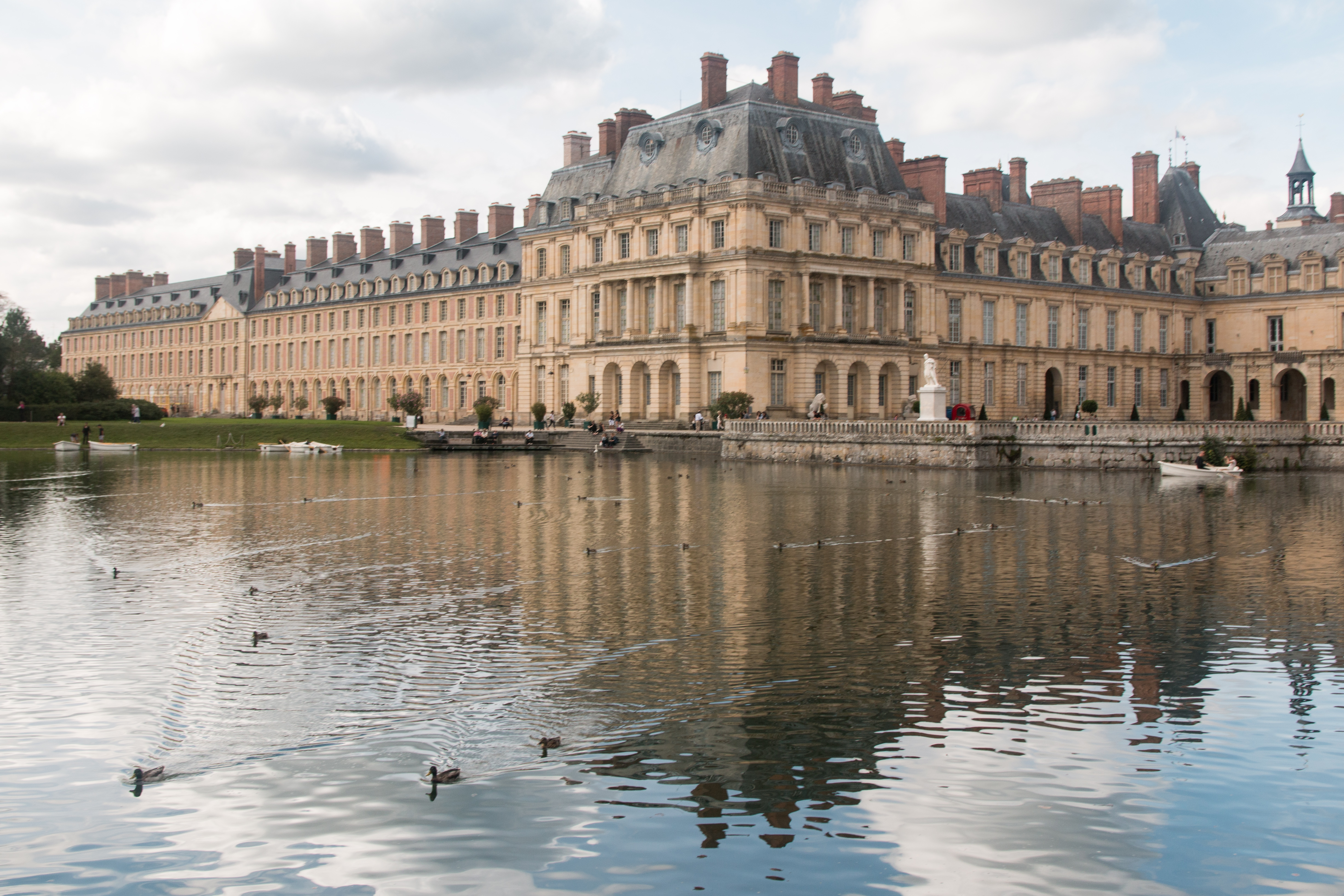
State Pavilion, designed by Ange-Jacques Gabriel (1750-1754), contained the updated apartments of the King and Queen and the Royal Council Chamber (1750-1754)

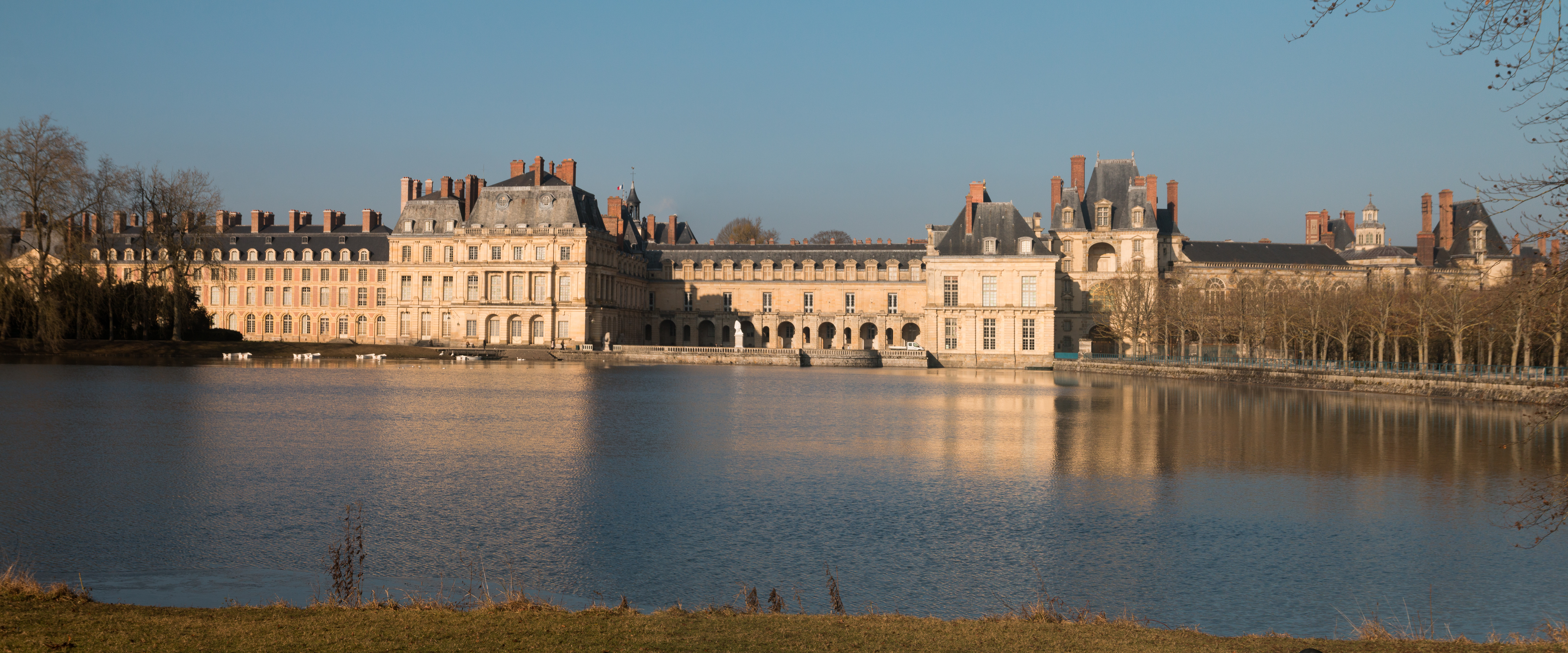
View from the South across the Carp Pond. The State Pavilion (1750-1754) is to the left; the Courtyard of the Fountain is in the center, the Oval Courtyard (1601-1606) and early palace buildings are to the right

== Palace Interior ==
=== Gallery of Francis I ===
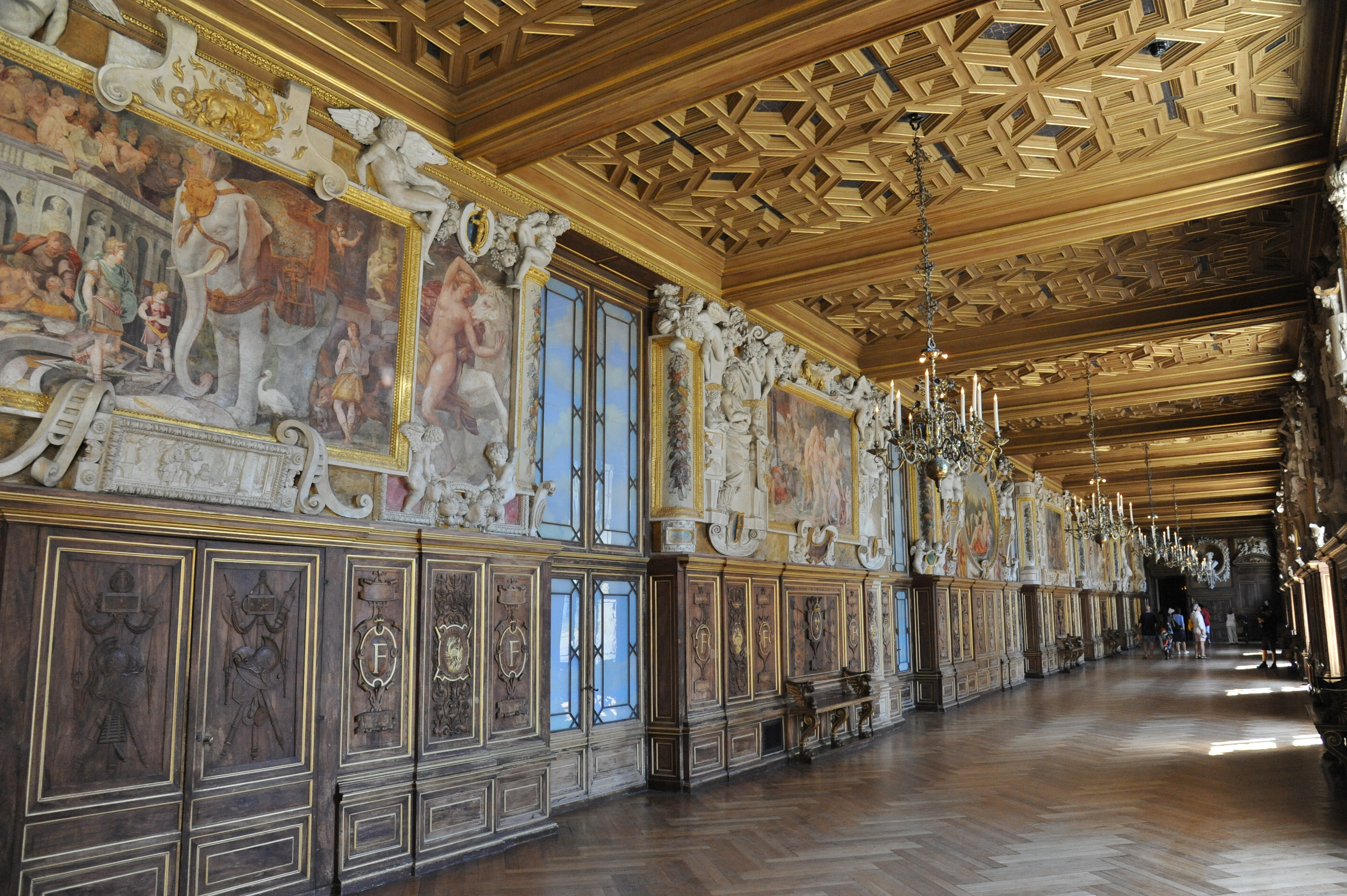
Gallery of Francis I, connecting the King's apartments with the chapel, was first decorated between 1533 and 1539. It introduced the Italian Renaissance style to France.

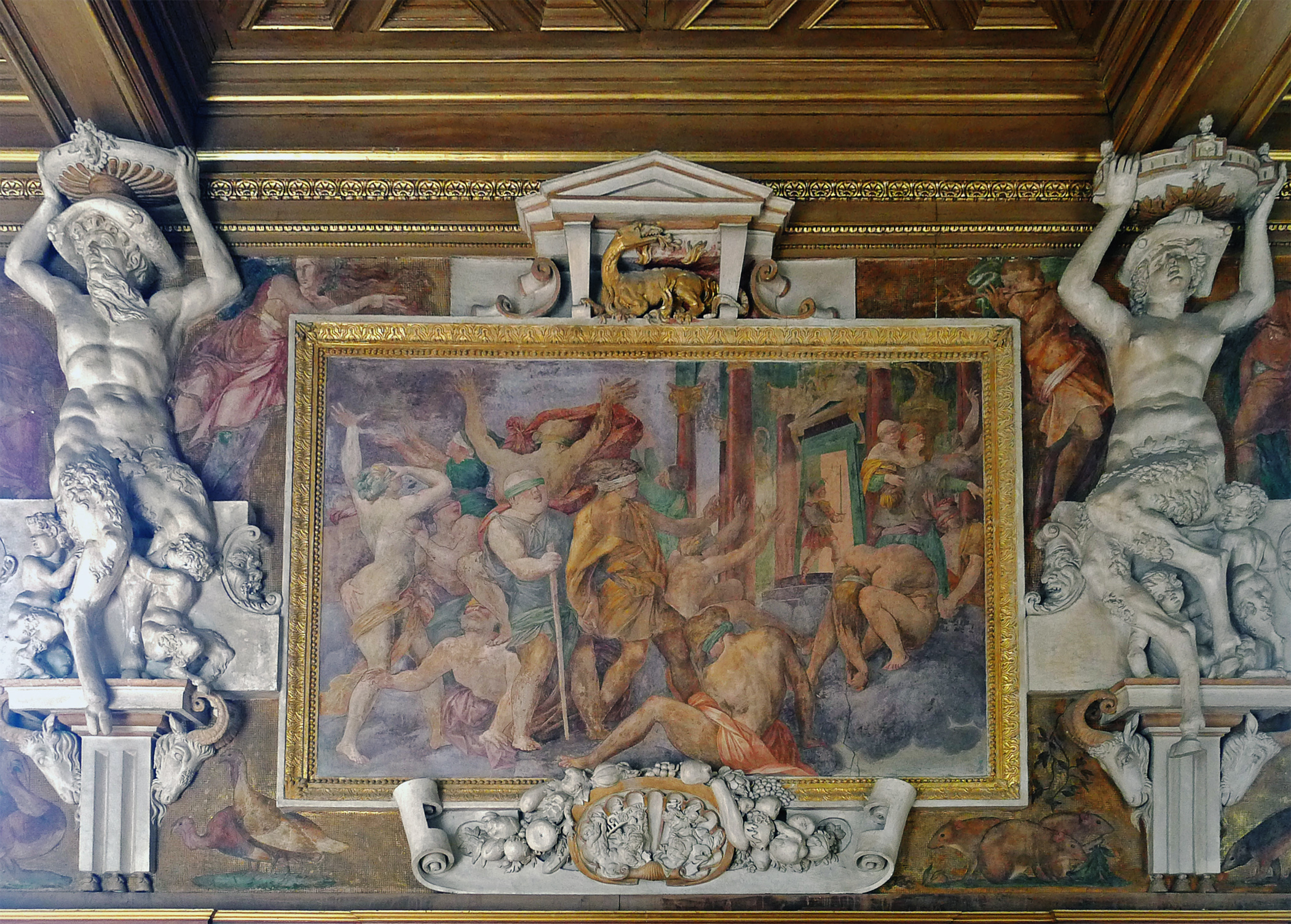
"The Enlightenment of Francis I" by Francesco Primaticcio

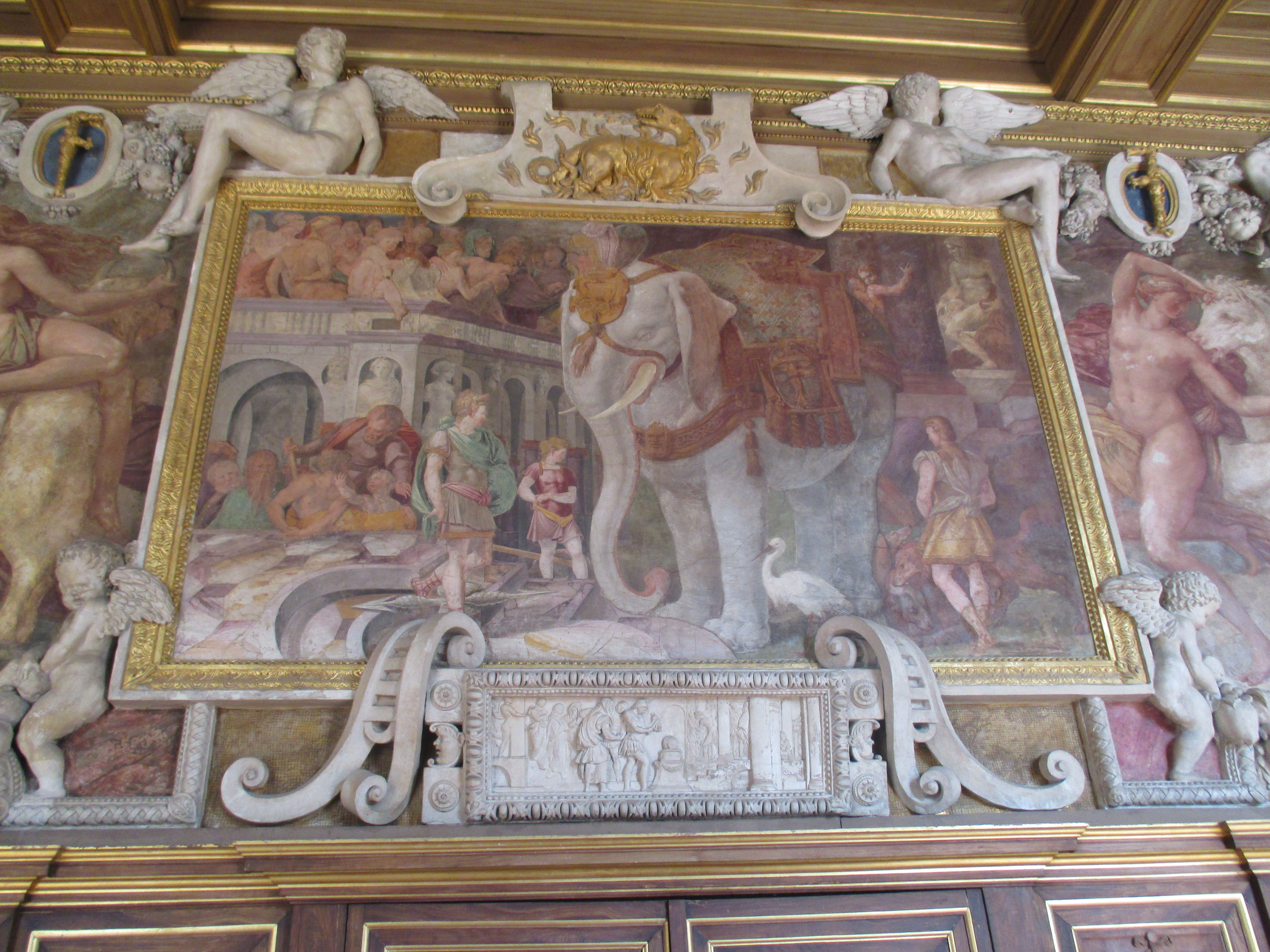
"The Royal Elephant" (center) - "The abduction of Europa by Jupiter" (left),"The Abduction of Phylira by Saturn" (right) by Rosso Fiorentino

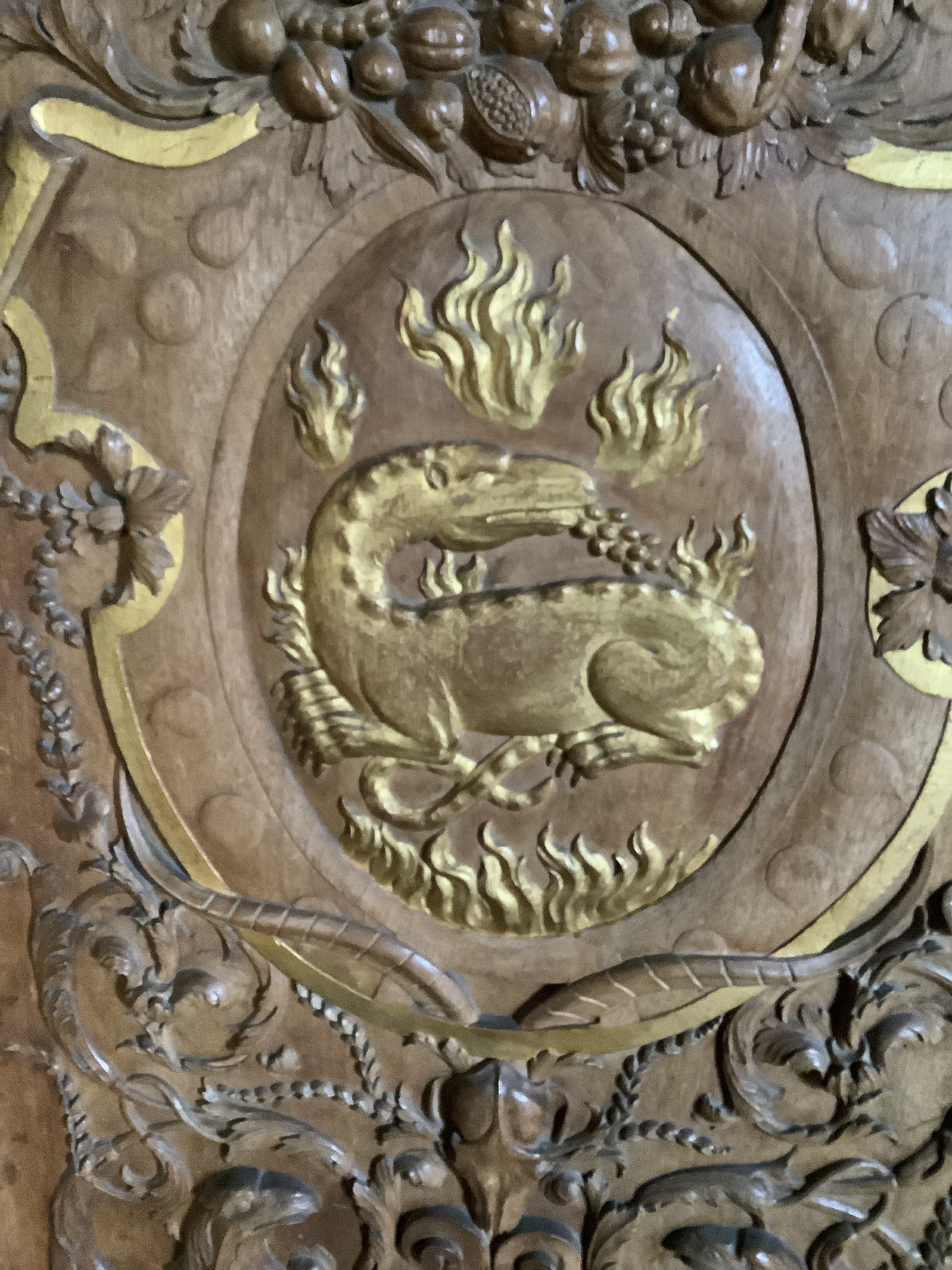
The emblem of Francis I, a salamander surrounded by flames, is found above each painting

The Gallery of Francis I is one of the first and finest examples of Renaissance decoration in France. It was begun in 1528 as a passageway between the apartments of the King with the oval courtyard and the great chapel of the Trinitarian monastery, but in 1531 Francis I made it a part of his royal apartments, and between 1533 and 1539 it was decorated by artists and craftsmen from Italy, under the direction of the painter Rosso Fiorentino, or Primaticcio, in the new Renaissance style. The lower walls of the passage were the work of the master Italian furniture maker Francesco Scibec da Carpi; they are decorated with the coat of arms of France and the salamander, the emblem of the King. The upper walls are covered by frescoes framed in richly sculpted stucco. The frescoes depicted mythological scenes to illustrate the virtues of the King.

On the side of gallery with windows, the frescoes represent Ignorance Driven Out; The Unity of the State; Cliobis and Biton; Danae; The Death of Adonis; The Loss of Perpetual Youth; and The Battle of the Centaurs and the Lapithes.

On the side of the gallery facing the windows, the frescoes represent: A Sacrifice; The Royal Elephant; The Burning of Catane; The Nymph of Fontainebleau (painted in 1860–61 by J. Alaux to cover a former entry to the gallery); The Sinking of Ajax;The Education of Achilles and The Frustration of Venus.

=== Ballroom (1552) ===
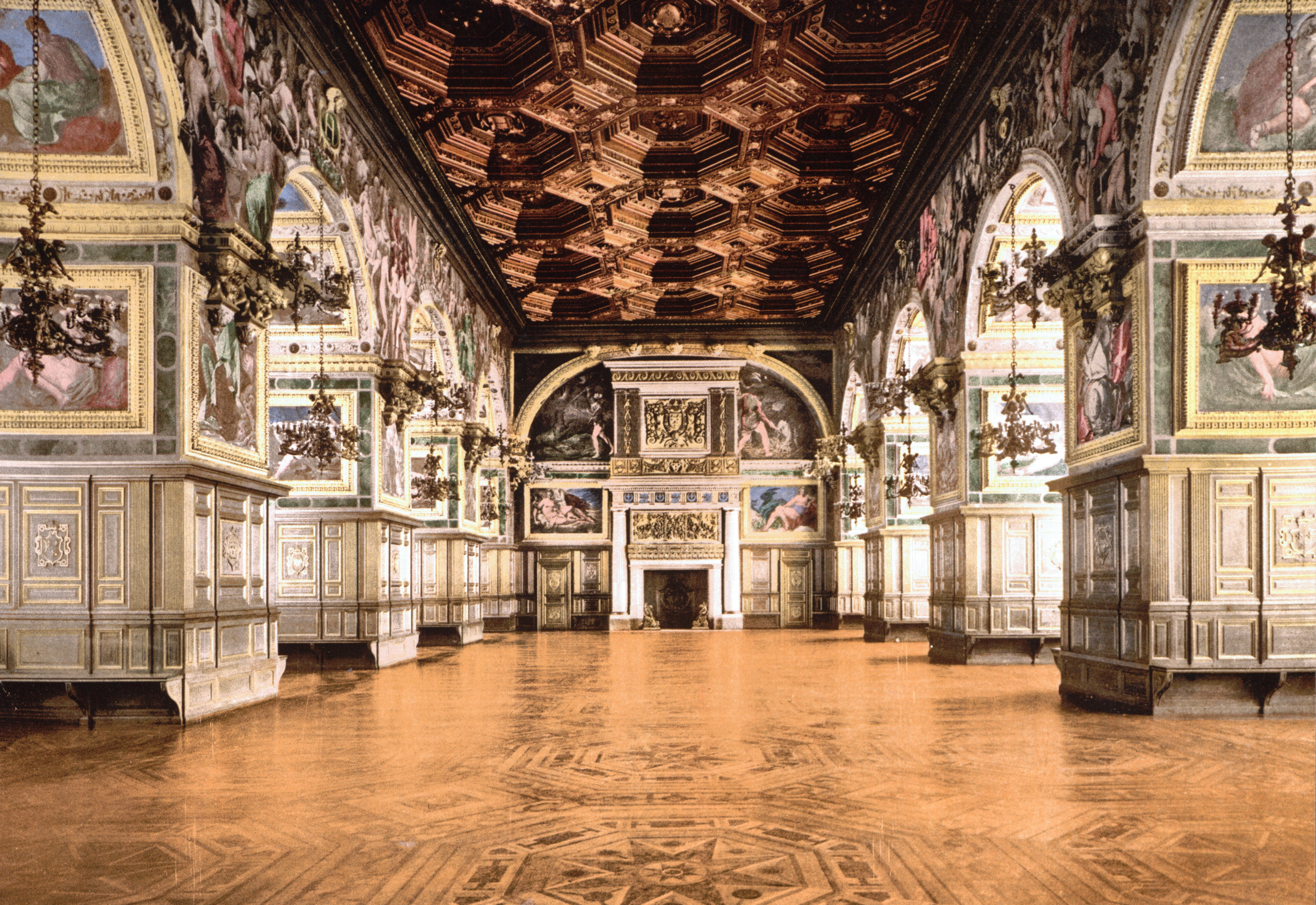
The Ballroom was created by King Henry II beginning in 1552

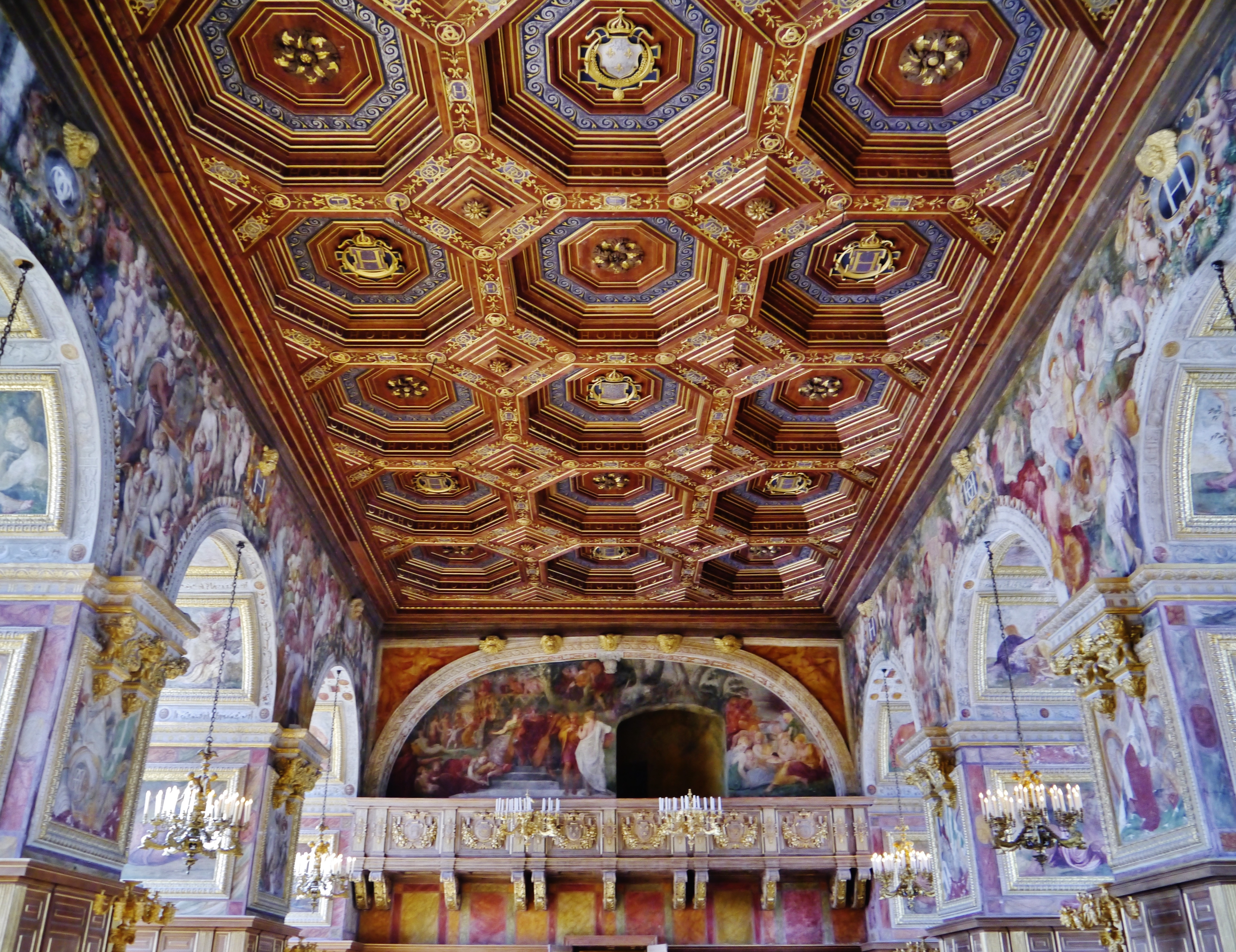
Musician's Gallery and the coffered ceiling of the ballroom

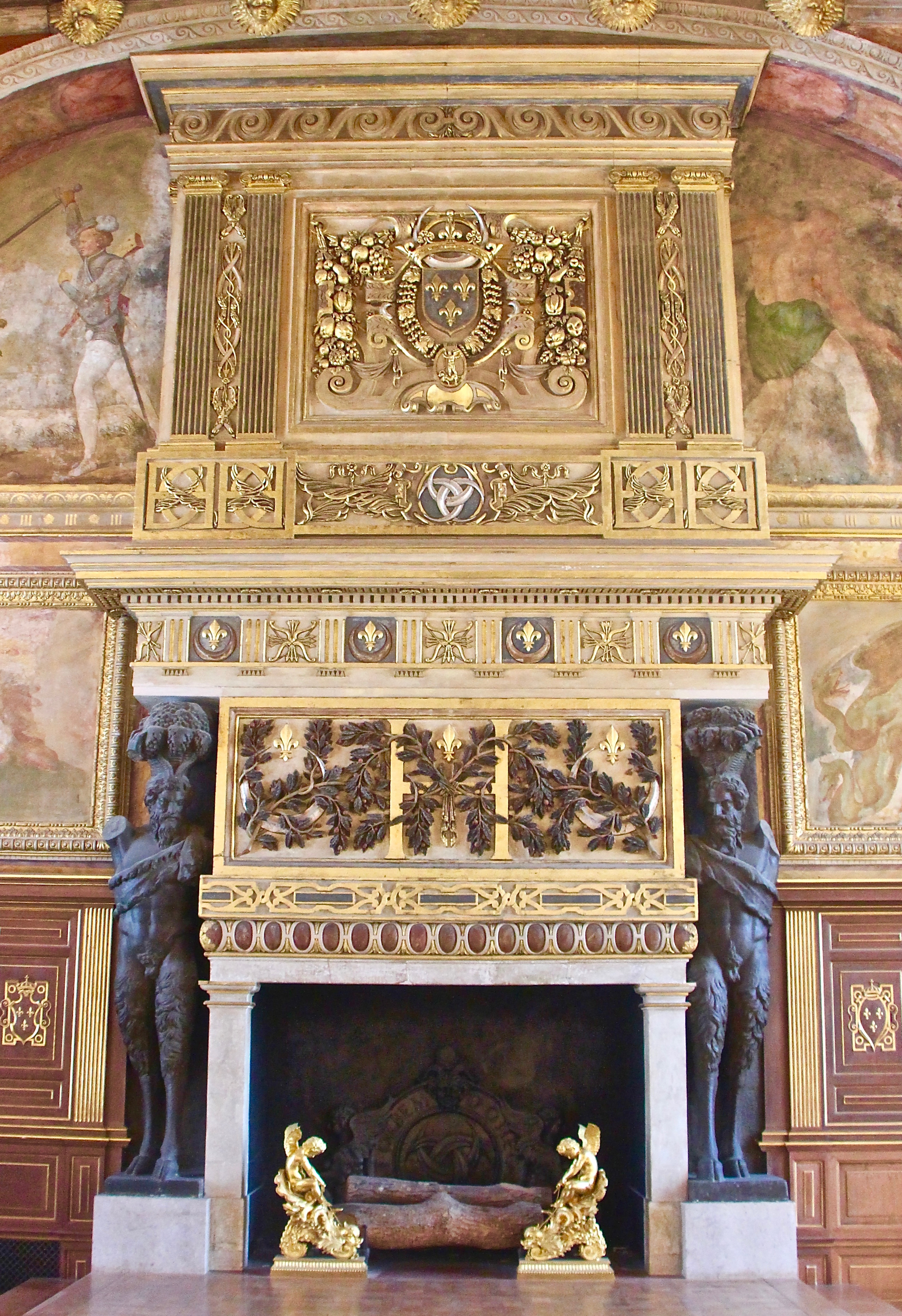
Fireplace in the ballroom, flanked by statues of satyrs

The ballroom was originally begun as an open passageway, or loggia, by Francis I. In about 1552 King Henry II closed it with high windows and an ornate coffered ceiling, and transformed it into a room for celebrations and balls. The 'H', the initial of the King, is prominent in the decor, as well as figures of the crescent moon, the symbol of Henry's mistress Diane de Poitiers. In the 19th century King Louis Philippe added the elaborate wooden floor, which copies the original designs in the coffers of the ceiling.

At the eastern end is a monumental fireplace, which flanked with two statues of Satyrs copied by Primaticcio from Roman originals. (The current statues are later copies). Above the eastern end of the room is a gallery where the musicians played during balls. The decor was restored many times over the years.

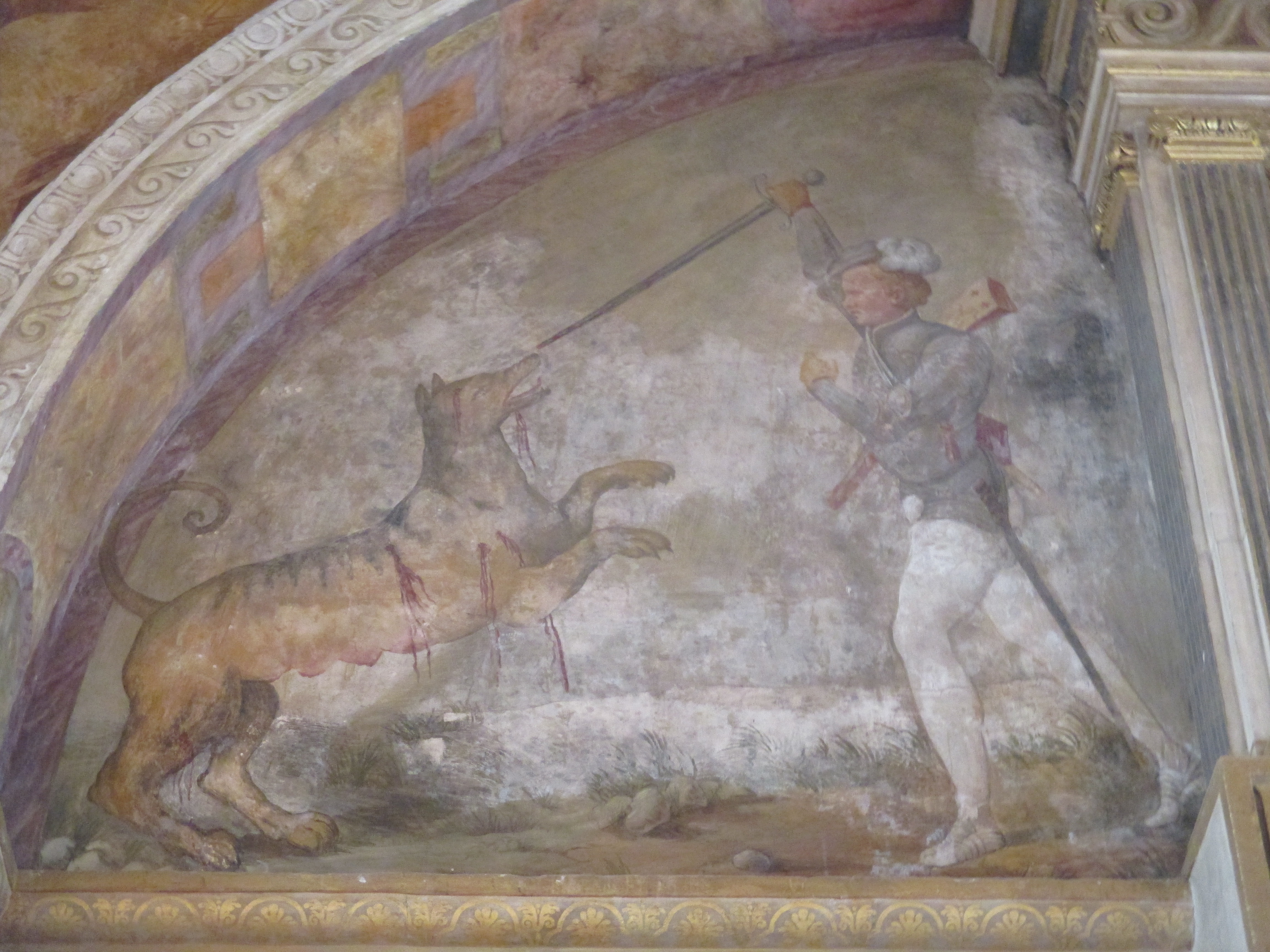
Hunter kills a boar in the forest of Orléans

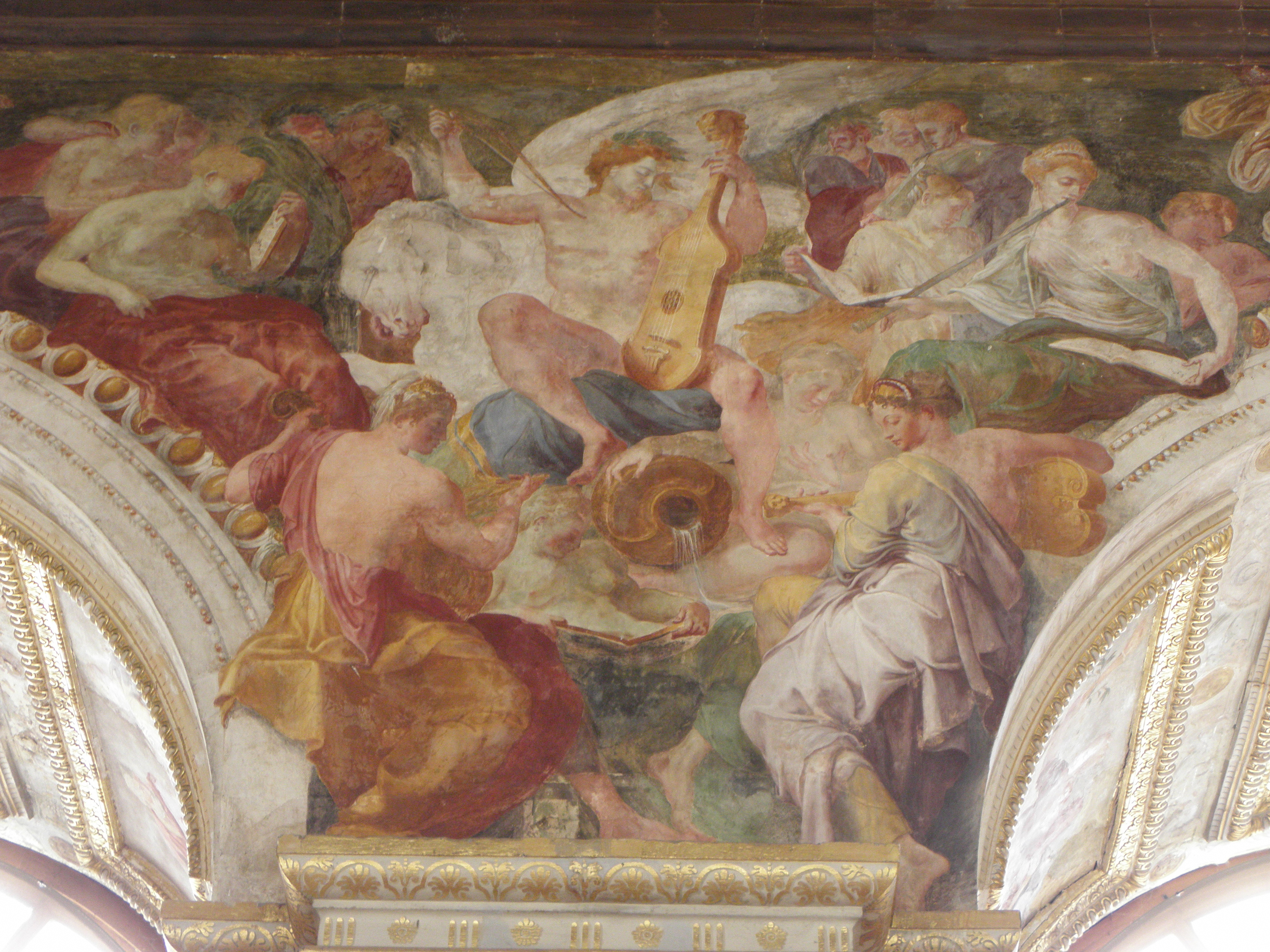
Fresco by Nicolo dell'Abate from designs by Primaticcio

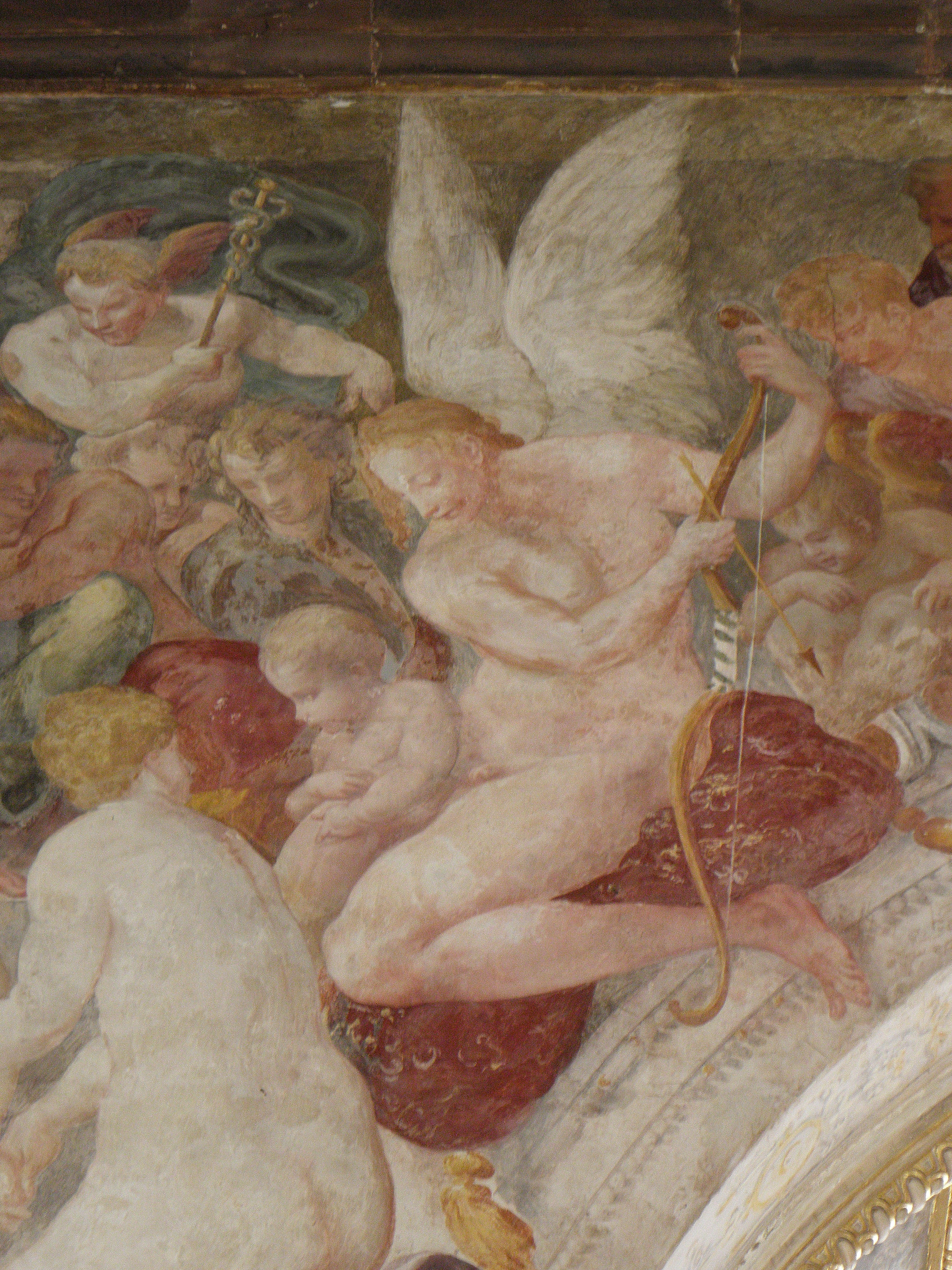
Fresco from design by Primaticcio

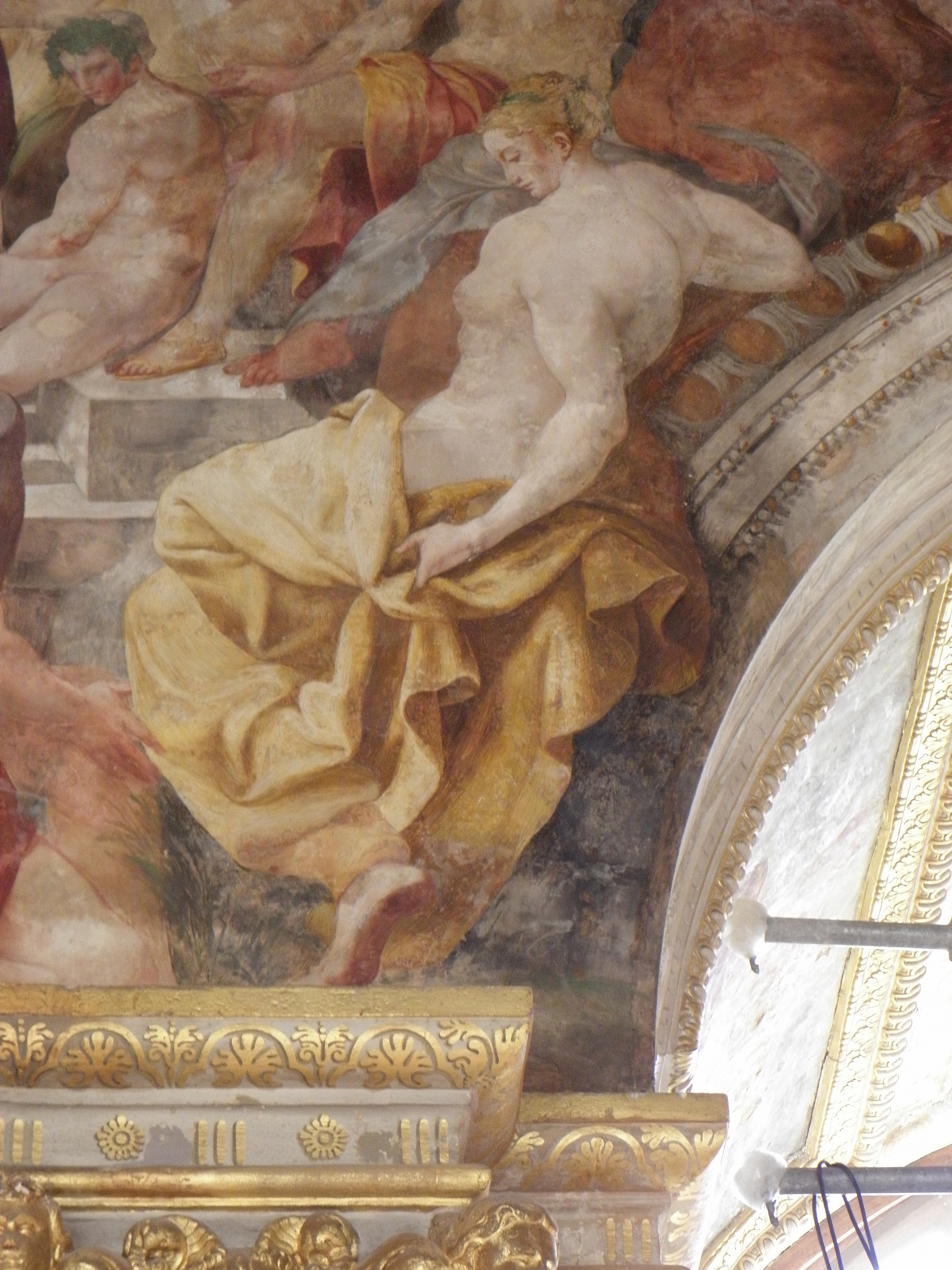
Fresco from design by Primaticcio

The frescoes on the walls and pillars were painted beginning in 1552 by Nicolo dell'Abate, following drawings by Primaticcio. On the garden side of the ballroom, they represent: The Harvest; Vulcan forging weapons for Love at the request of Venus; Phaeton begging the sun to let him drive his chariot; and Jupiter and Mercury at the home of Philemon and Baucis. The floor, which mirrors the design of the ceiling, was crafted by Louis-Philippe in the first half of the 19th century.

The frescoes on the side of the Oval Courtyard represent: The feast of Bacchus; Apollo and the Muses on Mount Parnassus; The Three Graces dancing before the gods; and The wedding feast of Thetis and Peleus.

Some of the fresco themes are more contemporary. A fresco above the fireplace depicts Sébastien de Rabutin, a huissier of the Court of Henry II, who in 1548 killed a wolf during a hunt in the forest of Orléans. Henry II commissioned the painting to commemorate the event.

=== Chapel of Saint Saturnin ===
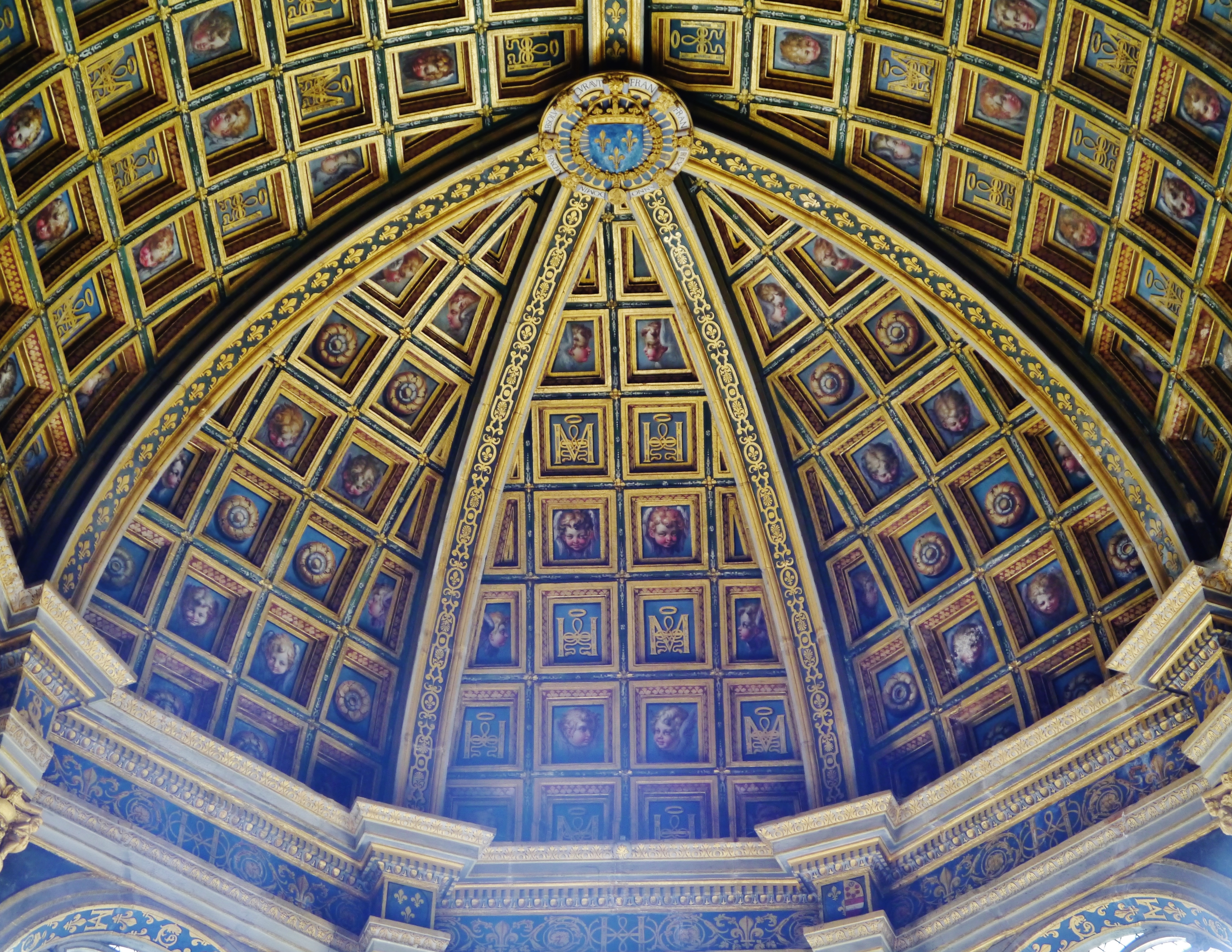
Ceiling of the Chapel with emblem of Henry II

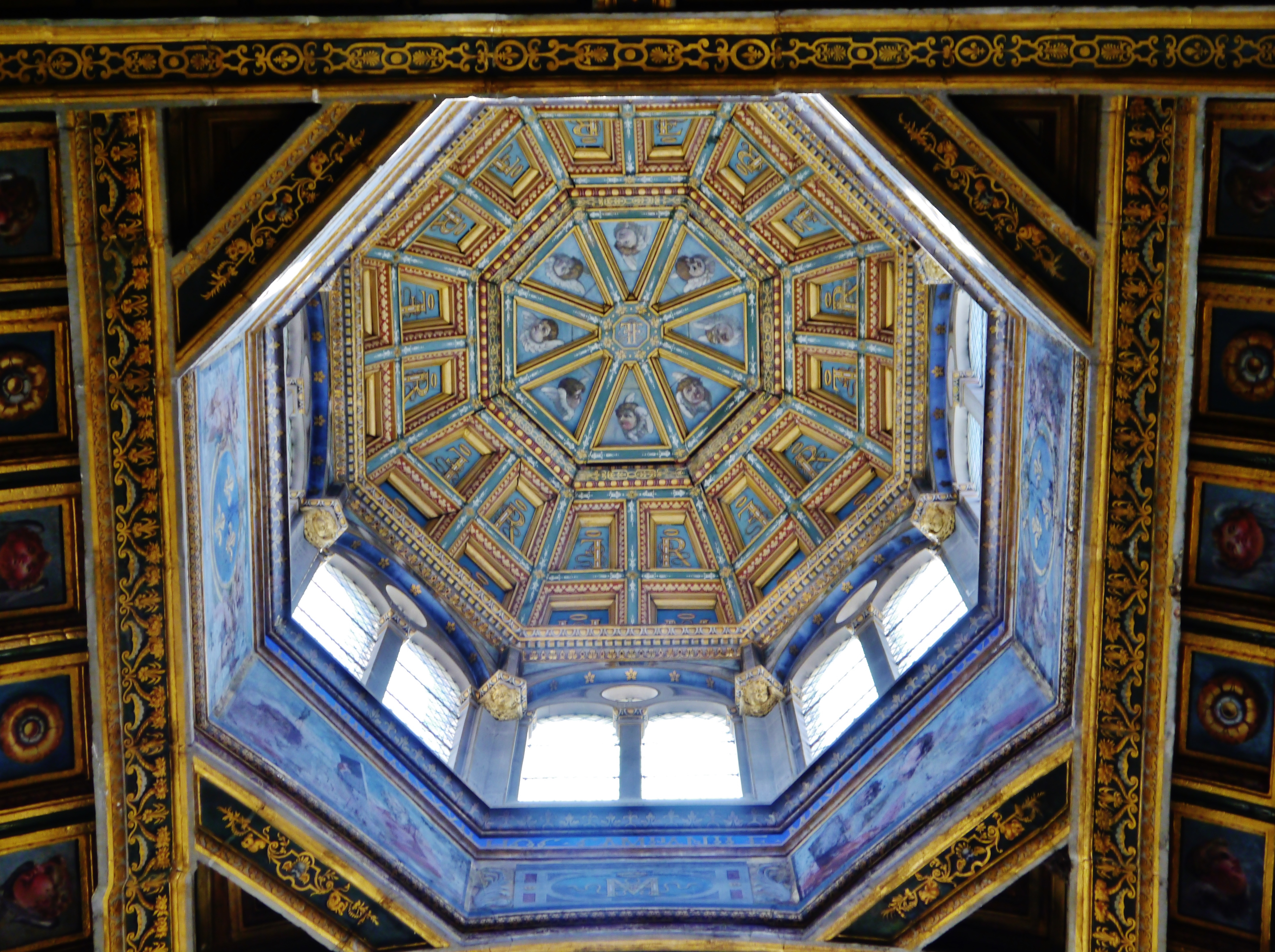
Dome over the chapel

Behind the ballroom is St. Saturnin's Chapel. The lower chapel was originally built in the 12th century, but was completely rebuilt under Francis I with a richly coffered ceiling and dome. It was largely completed in 1546. The emblem of Henry II, the salamander, marks the keystones.

In 1554, under Henry II, the architect Philibert de l'Orme built a new organ loft, supported by two tall marble columns.

Stained glass windows made in Sèvres, designed by Louis' daughter Marie, an artist, were installed in the 19th century during the Louis Philippe period.

=== The King's Staircase ===
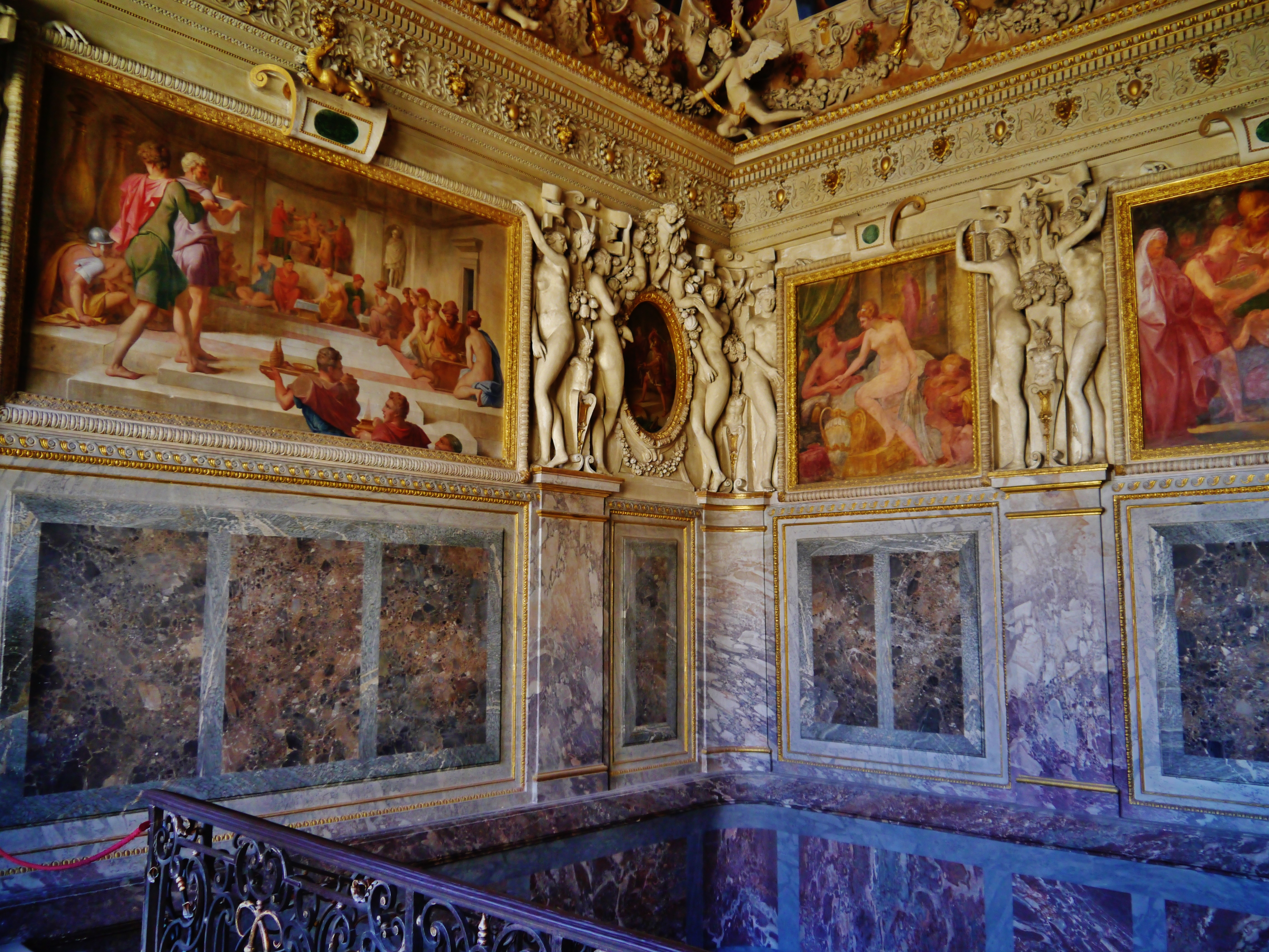
Paintings and sculpture in the King's Stairway

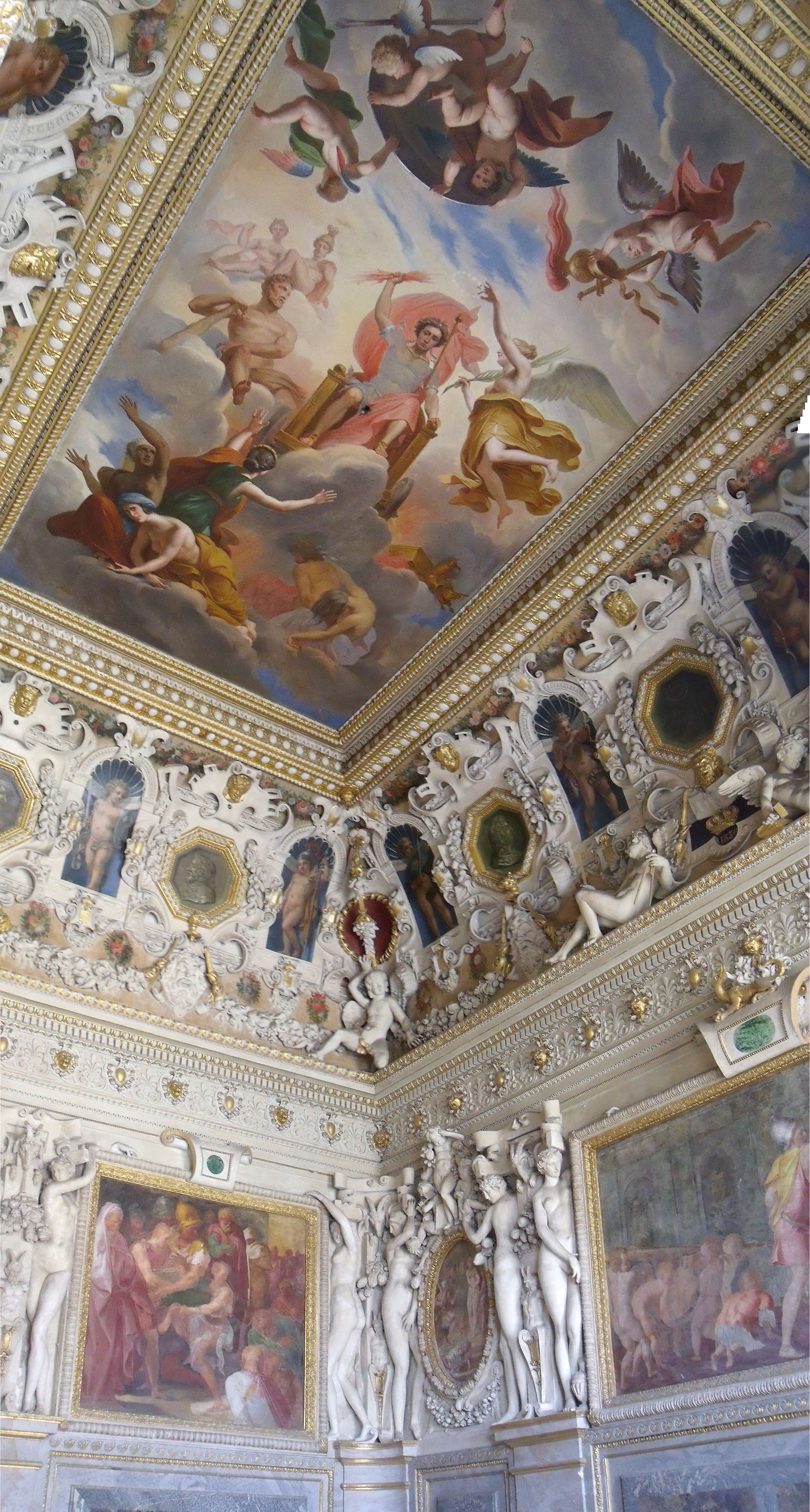
King's Staircase (1748–1749)

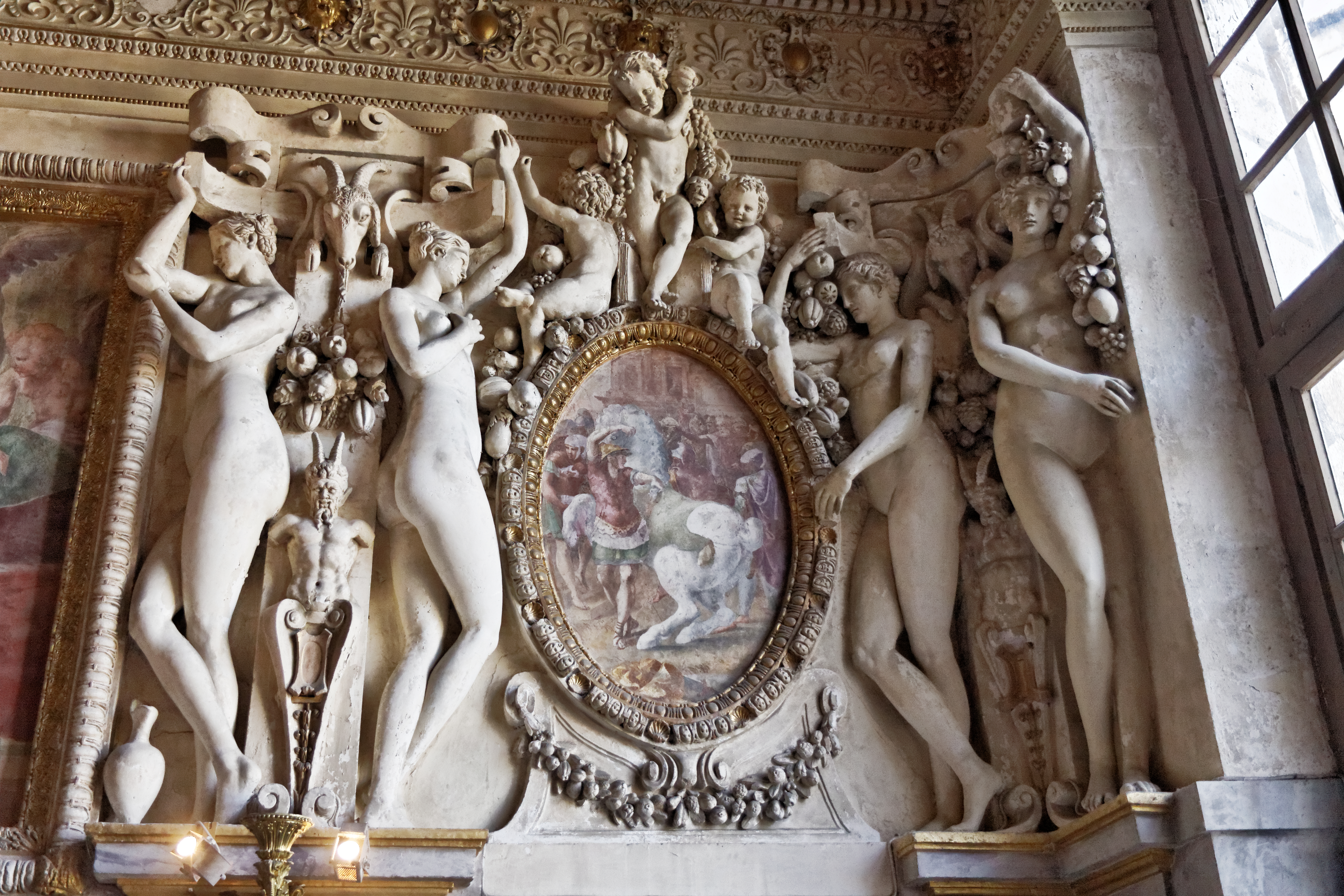
Decoration of the King's Staircase

The stairway of the King was installed in 1748 and 1749, in the space occupied during the reign of Francis I by the bedroom of Anne de Pisseleu, the Duchess of Étampes, a favorite of the King. It was designed by the architect Ange-Jacques Gabriel, who used many decorative elements from the earlier room, which had originally been decorated by Primaticcio. The upper portion of the walls is divided into panels, oval and rectangular, with scenes representing the love life of Alexander the Great. The paintings are framed by large statues of women by Primaticcio. The eastern wall of the room was destroyed during the reconstruction, and was replaced during the reign of Louis Philippe in the 19th century with paintings by Abel de Pujol.

=== The Queen's bedchamber ===
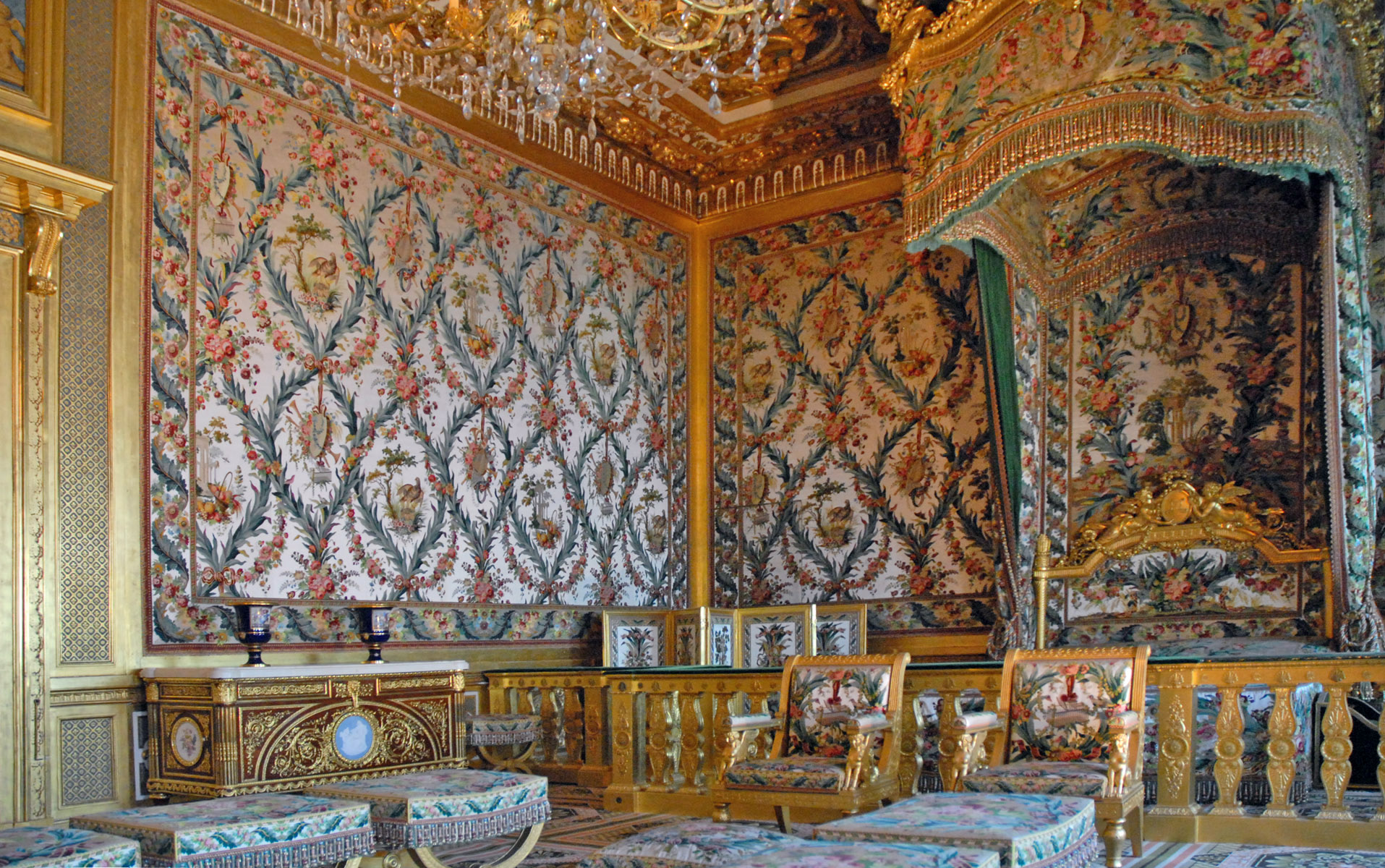
The bedchamber of the Queen

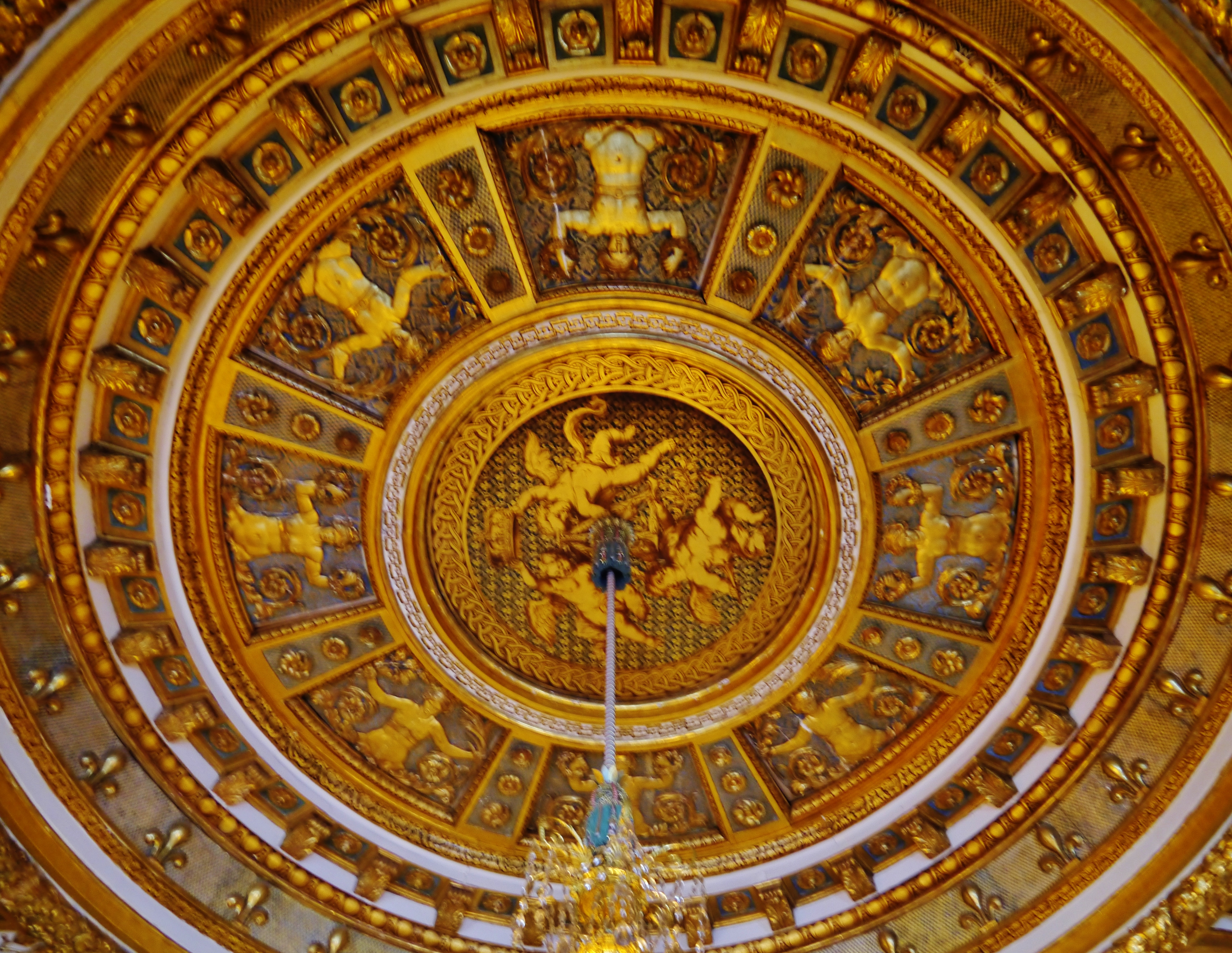
Center of the bedroom ceiling, carved by Guillaume Noyers (1644)

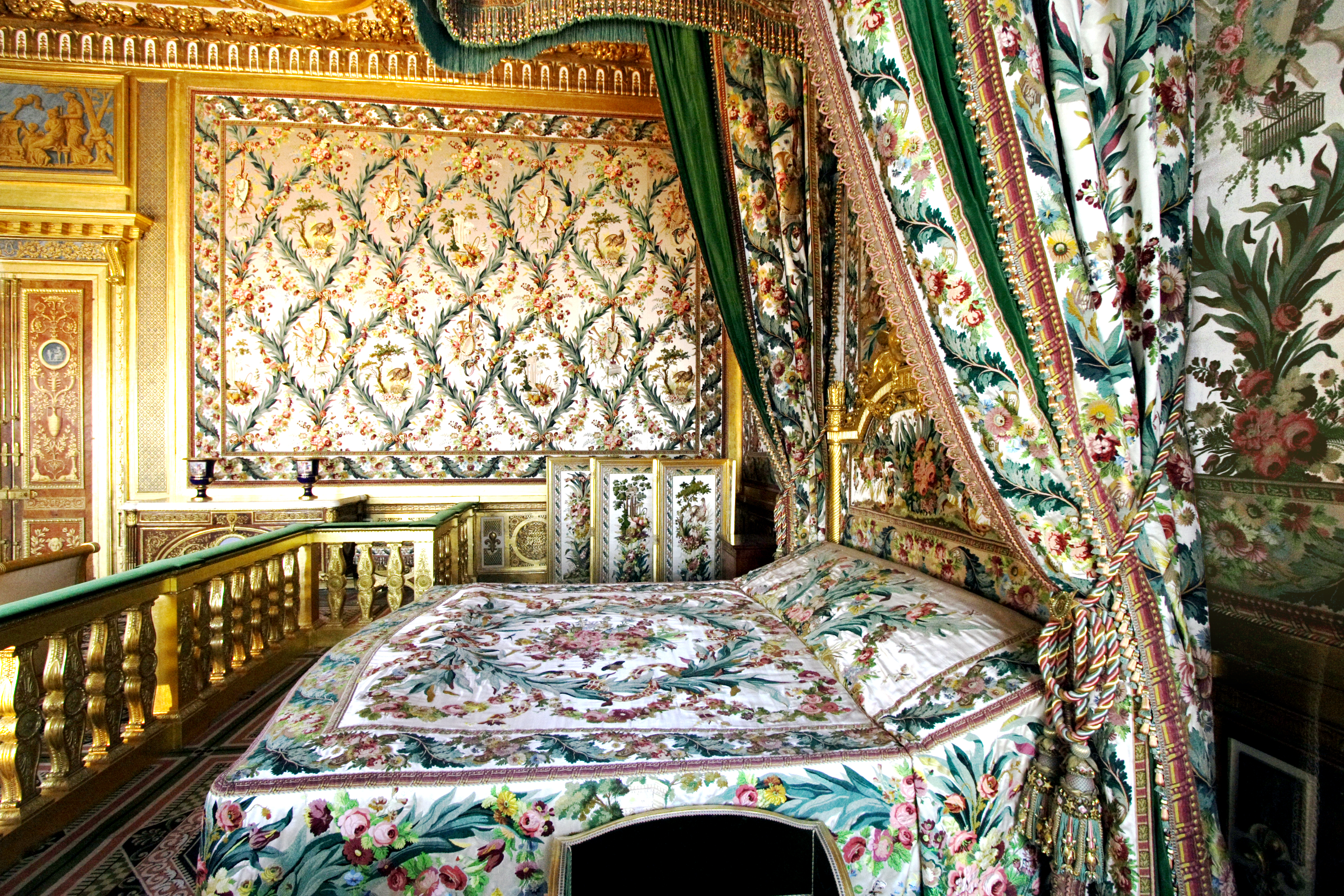
The bed of Marie Antoinette, ordered for her just before the French Revolution. It was used by the Empresses Josephine and Marie-Louise.

All of the queens and empresses of France, from Marie de' Medici to the Empress Eugènie, slept in the bedchamber of the Queen. The ornate ceiling over the bed was made in 1644 by the furniture-maker Guillaume Noyers for the Dowager Queen Anne of Austria, the mother of Louis XIV, and bears her initials. The room was redecorated by Marie Leszczynska, the Queen of Louis XV in 1746–1747. The ceiling of the alcove, the decoration around the windows and the wood panelling were made by Jacques Vererckt and Antoine Magnonais in the rocaille style of the day. The decoration of the fireplace dates to the same period.

The doors have an arabesque design, and were made for Marie Antoinette, as were the sculpted panels over the doors, installed in 1787. The bed was also made specially for Marie Antoinette, but did not arrive until 1797, after the Revolution and her execution. As a result it escaped the sales of the château furnishings which took place immediately after the Revolution. It was used instead by Napoleon's wives, the Empress Joséphine and Marie-Louise of Austria.

The walls received their ornamental textile covering, with a design of flowers and birds, in 1805. It was restored in 1968–1986 using the original fabric as a model. The furniture in the room all dates to the First Empire. The balustrade around the bed was originally made for the throne room of the Tuileries Palace in 1804. The armchairs with a sphinx pattern, the consoles and screen and the two chests of drawers were placed in the room in 1806.

=== Boudoir of Marie-Antoinette (1786) ===
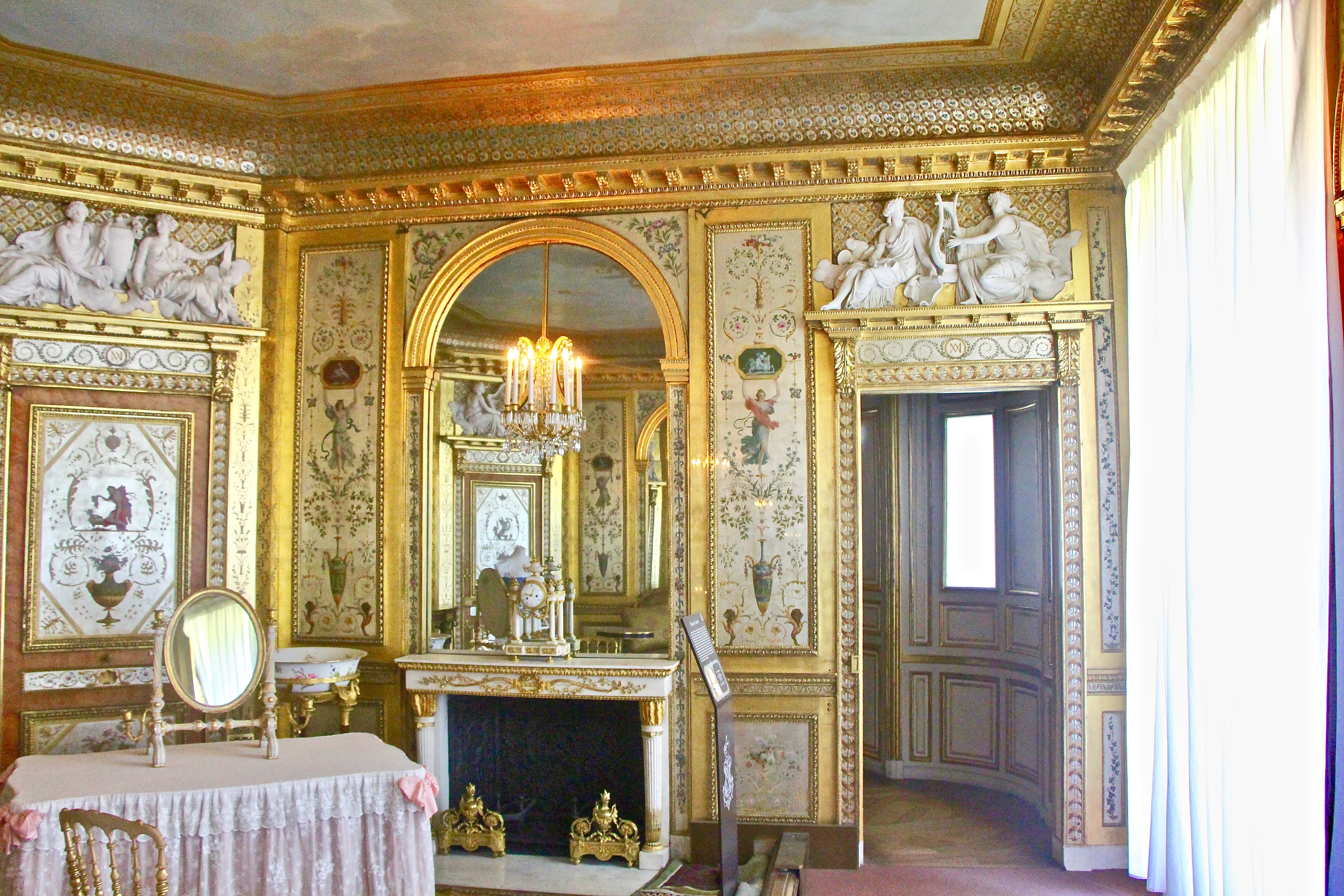
Boudoir of Queen Marie Antoinette (1786)

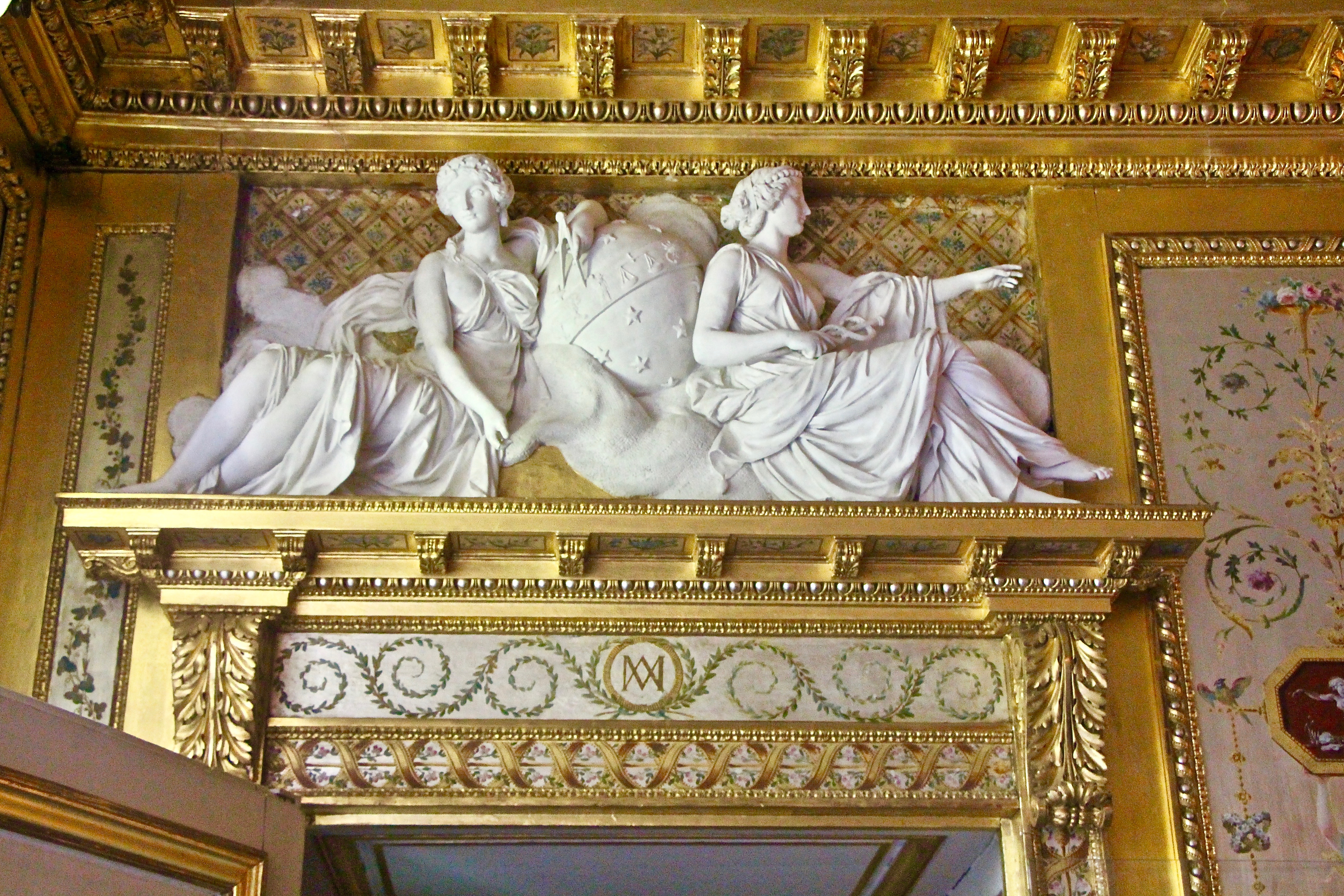
Doorway sculpture by Sauvage with initials of Marie Antoinette (1787)

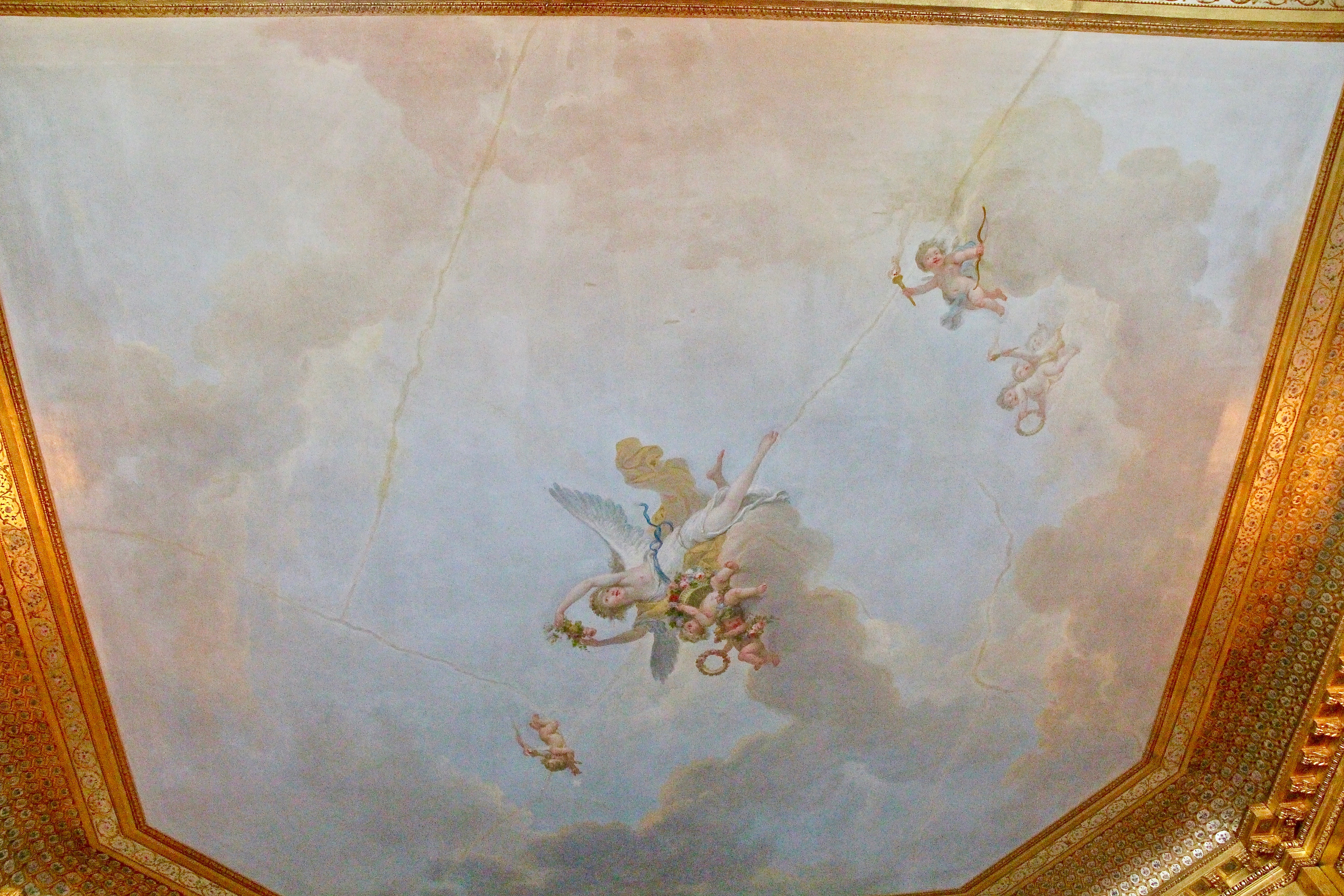
Ceiling of angels painted by Bourgeois and Touze (1786)

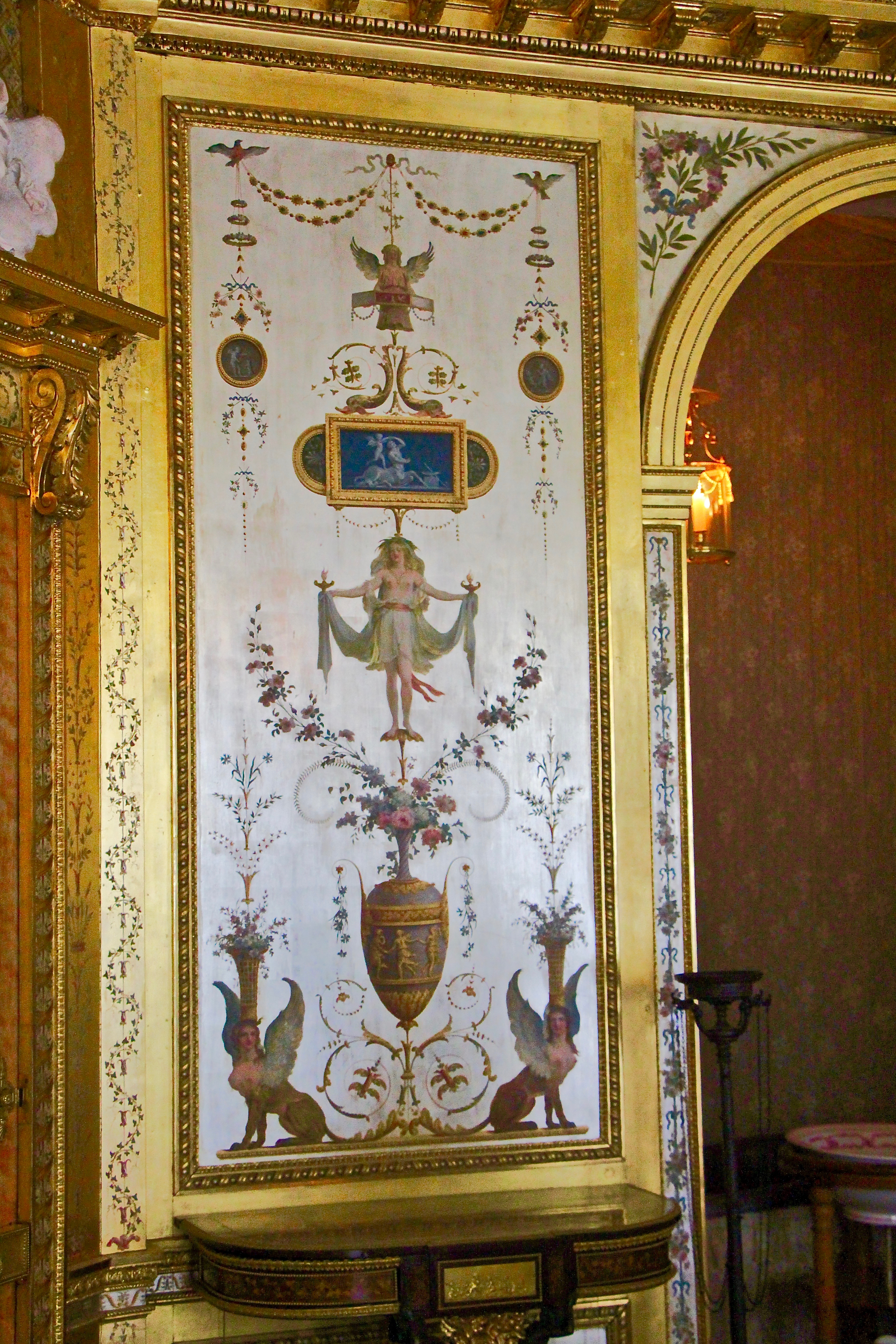
Decorative panel in the Queens's boudoir

The boudoir next to the queen's bedroom was created for Queen Marie Antoinette in 1786, and permitted the queen to have a measure of privacy. The room is the best surviving example of the decorative style just before the French Revolution, inspired by ancient Roman models, with delicately painted arabesques, cameos, vases, antique figures and garlands of flowers against a silver background, framed by gilded and sculpted woodwork.

The room was made for the Queen by the same team of artists and craftsmen who also made the game room; the design was by the architect Pierre Rousseau (1751–1829). The wood panelling was sculpted by Laplace, and painted by Michel-Hubert Bourgeois and Louis-François Touzé. Eight figures of the Muses were made in plaster by Roland; the ornate mantle of the fireplace was made by Jacques-François Dropsy, and decorated with glided bronze works by Claude-Jean Pitoin. The mahogany parquet floor, decorated with the emblems of the Queen, was made by Bernard Molitor, and finished in 1787. The painted ceiling, by Jean-Simon Berthélemy, shows Aurora with a group of angels.

The furnishings were designed for the room by Jean-Henri Riesener, using the finest materials available; mother of pearl, gilded bronze, brass, satin and ebony. Some of the original furnishings remain, including the cylindrical desk and the table, which were made between 1784 and 1789. The two armchairs are copies of the originals made by Georges Jacob which are now in the Gulbenkian Museum in Lisbon, while the footstool is the original.

=== Games Room of Marie-Antoinette and Grand Salon of the Empress Eugenie (1786) ===
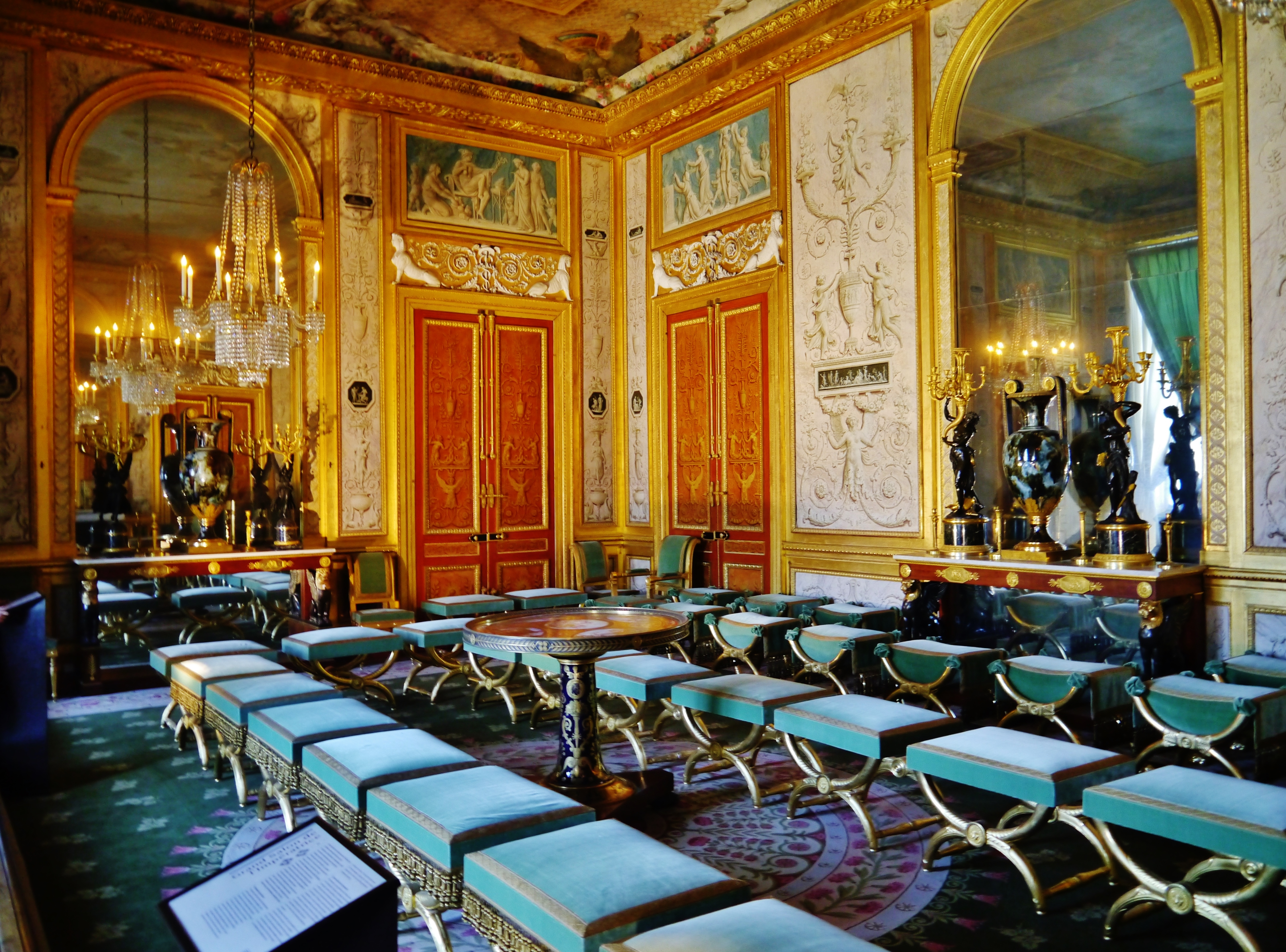
Arabesque decoration of the First French Empire

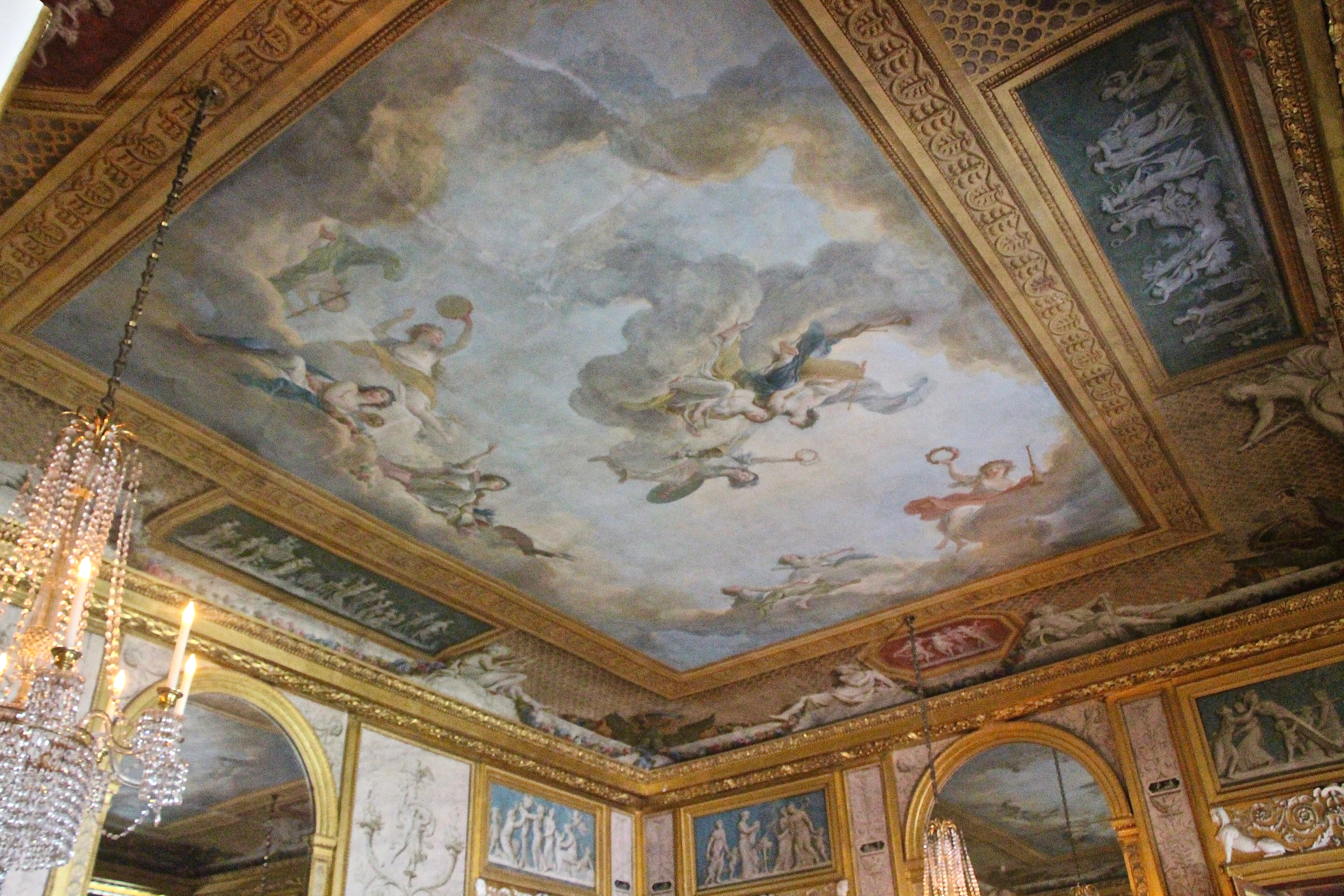
Ceiling of the Grand Salon, ""The Muses being crowned by Minerva" by Jean-Simon Berthélemy (1786)

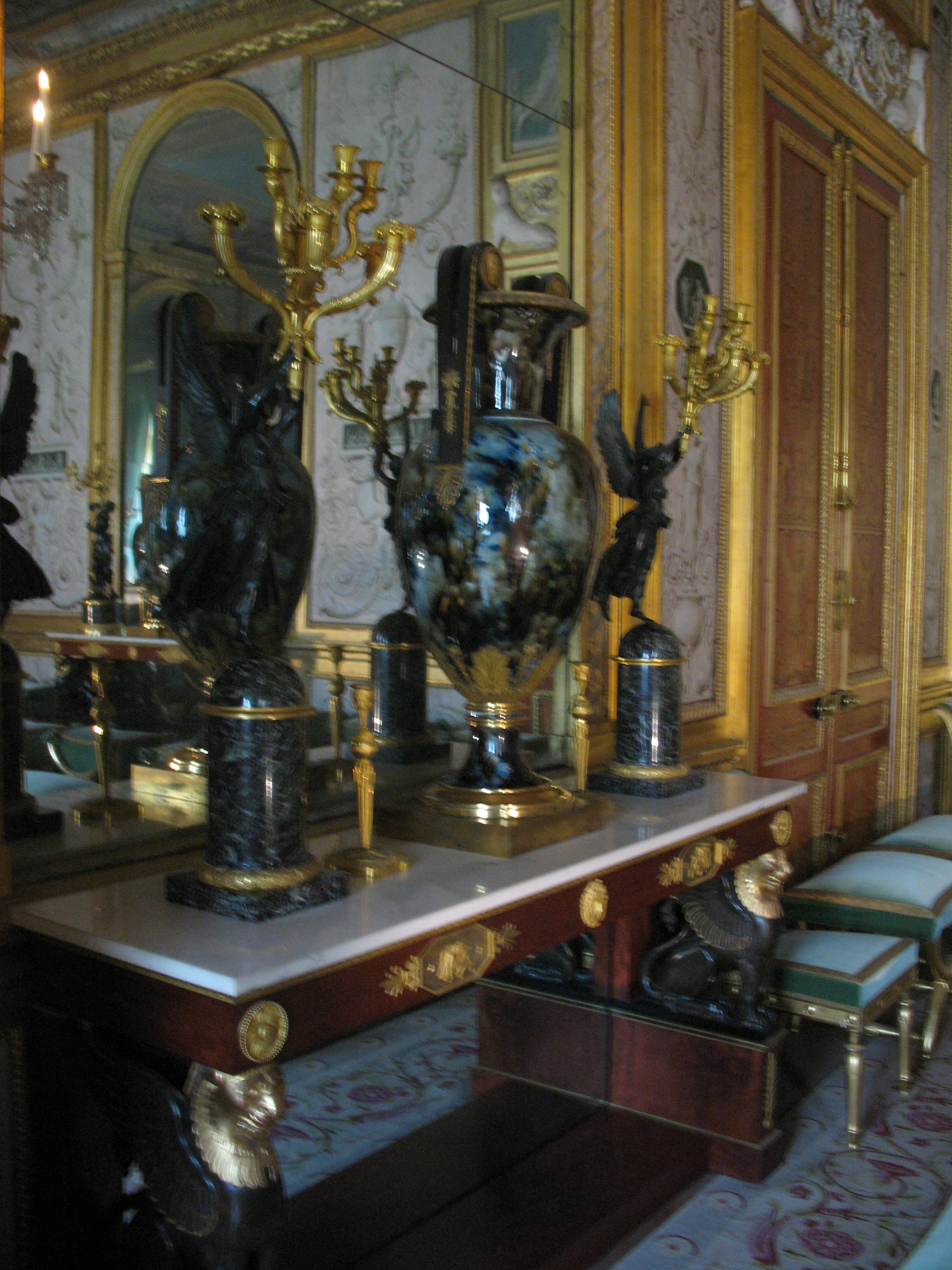
Sevres vases

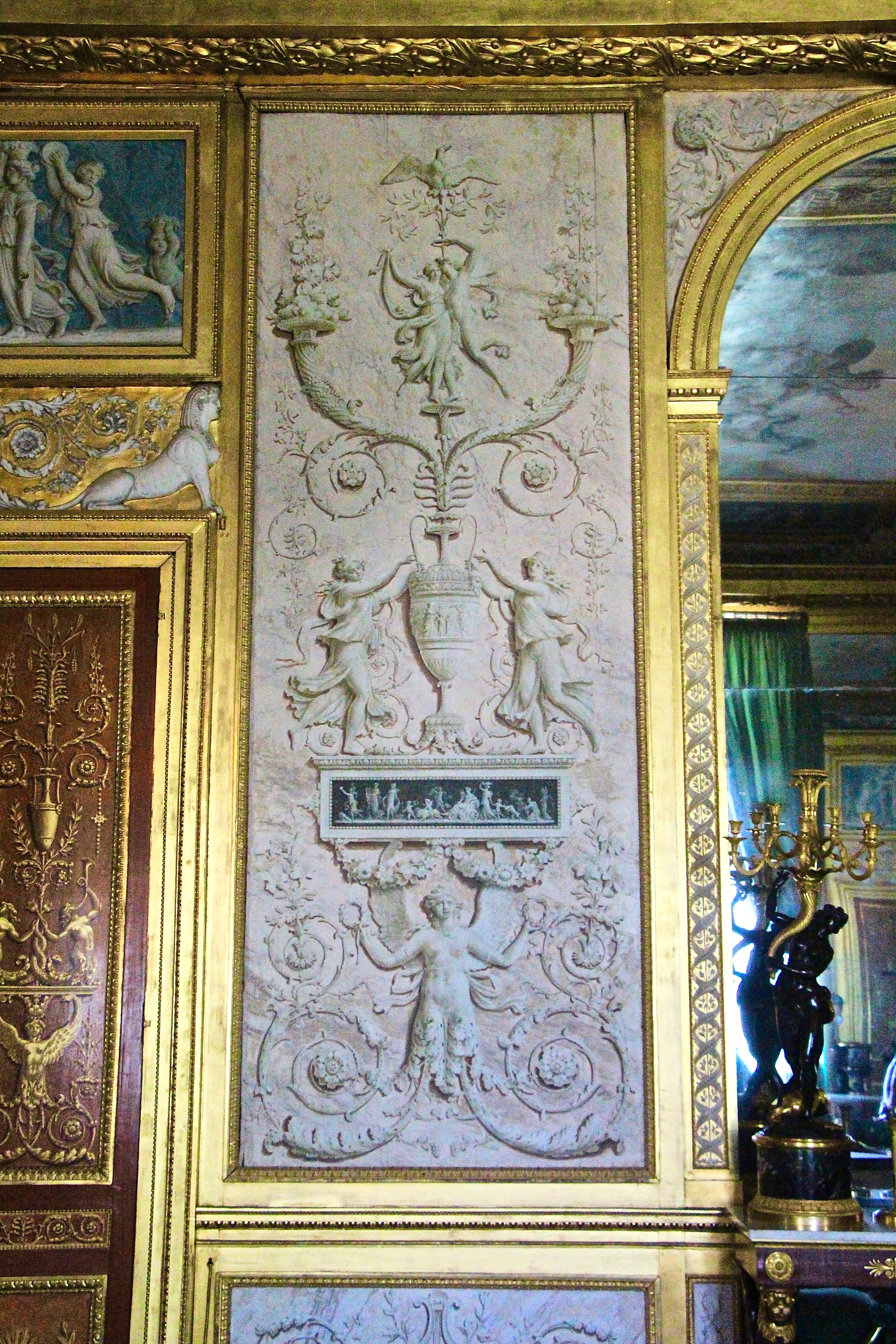
Arabseque wall panel (18th century)

The Games Room was created for Marie Antoinette in 1786, and is a notable example of the Arabesque style popular in the First French Empire in the 18th century. The walls are filled with large wall panels, with grisaille and monochrome depictions twining plants, women in flowing robes, dancers, mermaids, torches and vases. The same designs appear in gilding on the mahogany doors.

The room is now furnished in the Empire style. The chairs followed the rules of protocol, with armchairs for the Emperor and Empress, chairs for princesses, and folding chair and stools covered with green velvet trimmed with gold for the guests.

=== The Queen's Small Salon or the White Salon (1835) ===
The White Salon was created in 1835 as a salon for Queen Marie-Amelie, the wife of King Louis Philippe to replace the Queen's Study of Marie de Medici. Just one element of the 17th century salon, remains; paintings by Amboise Dubois depicting the legend of Tancred and Clorinda. It is one of the best examples of the 19th century style of Louis-Philippe, which blended together earlier styles; it combined wainscotting from the reign of Louis XV of France, along with a Louis XVI style fireplace, an Empire style chimney, and armchairs by Jacob-Freres and Jacob Desmalter and other prominent designers of the early 19th century.

=== Bed chamber of the Kings of France and Throne Room of Napoleon ===
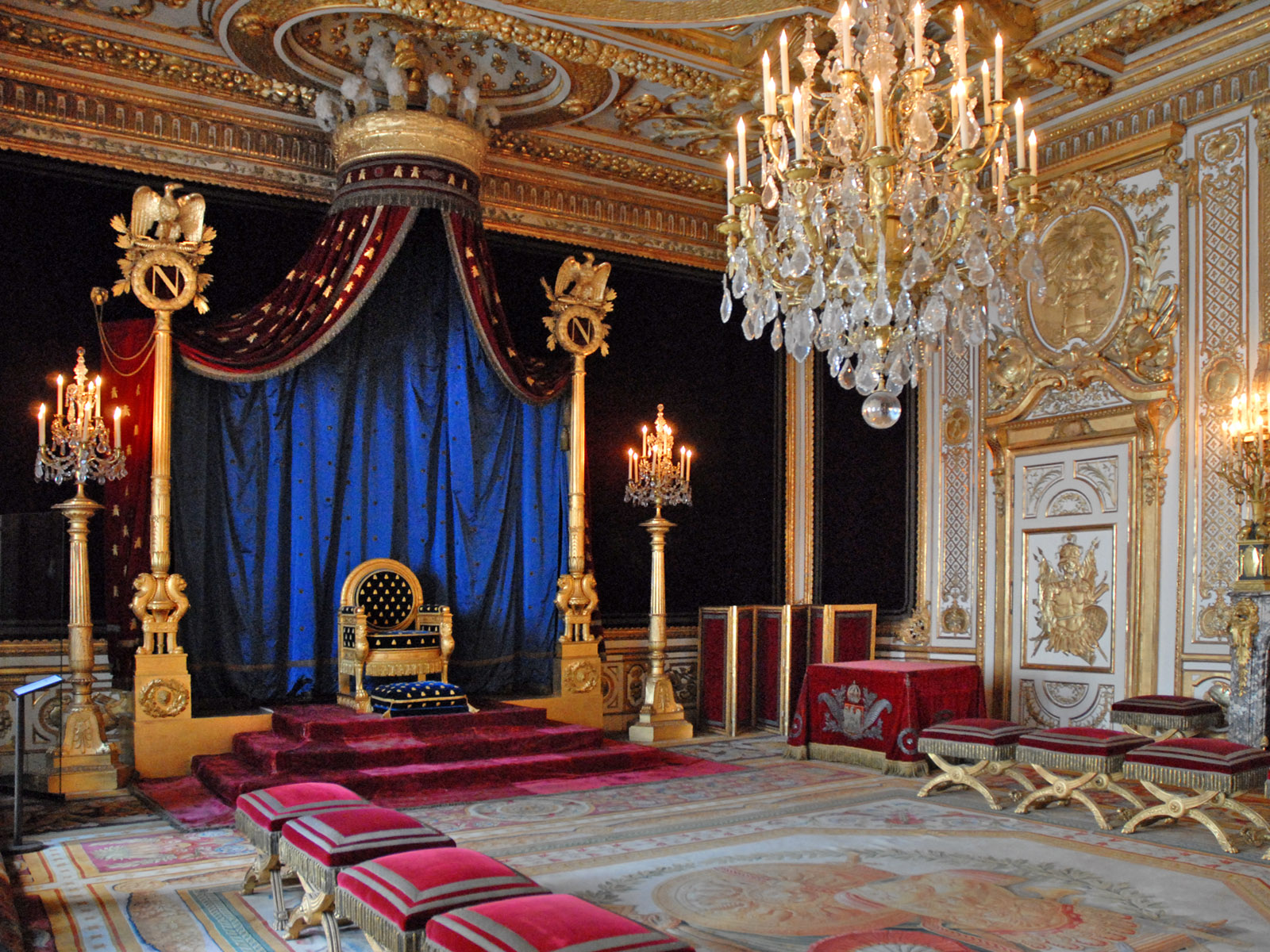
Bed Chamber of the Kings of France and Throne Room of Napoleon

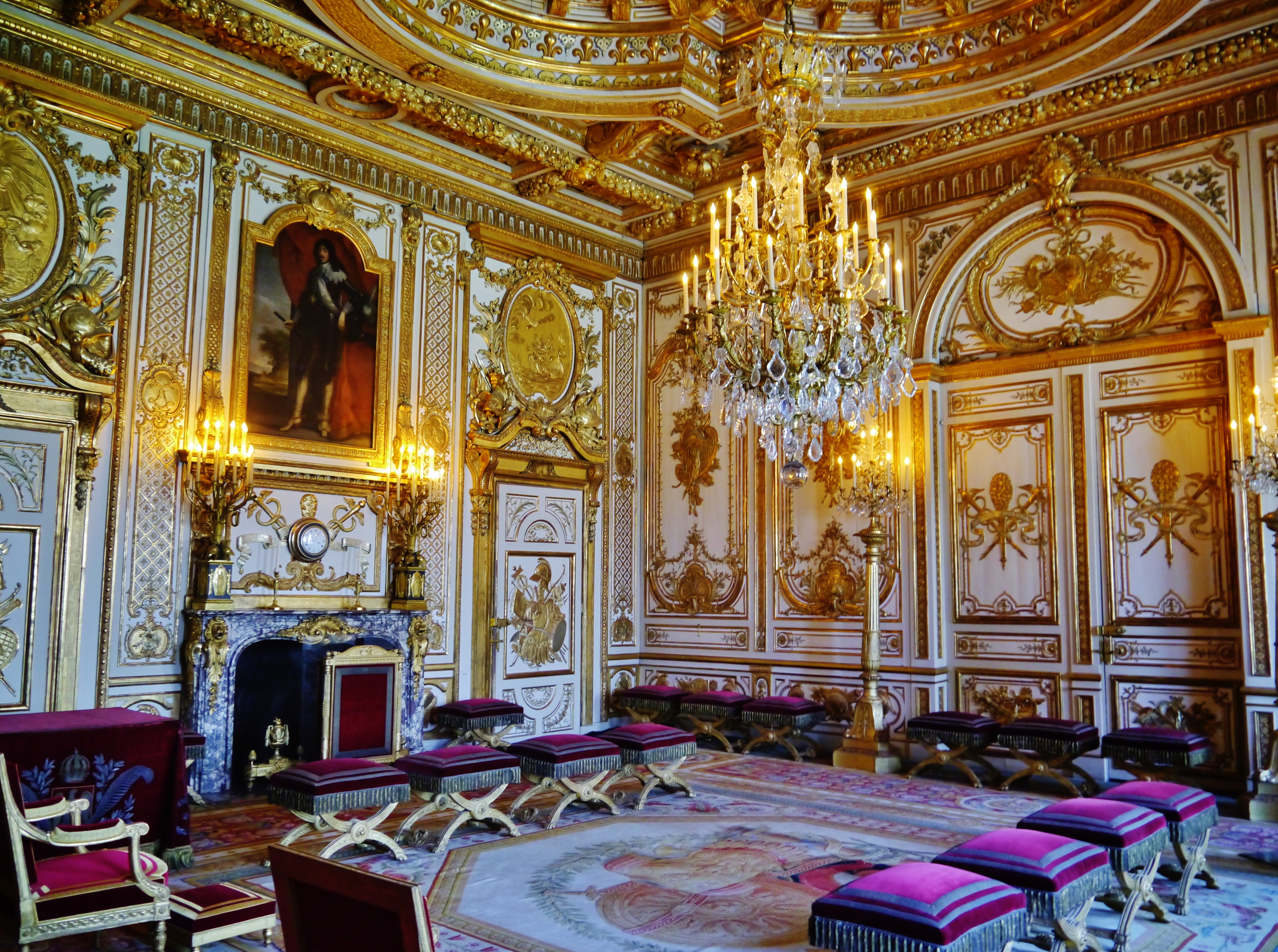
Decor from throne room of Louis XV (1752-54)

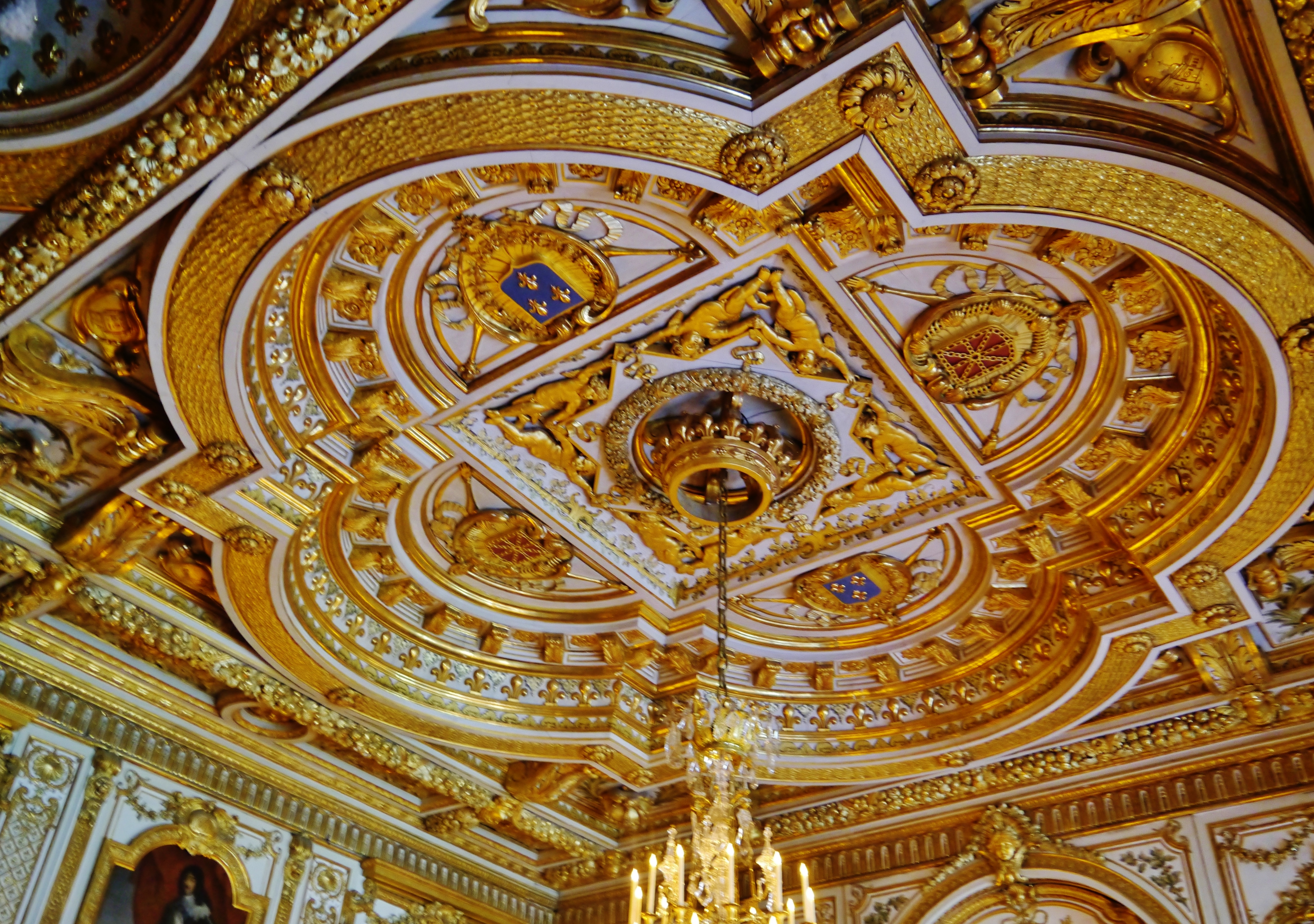
Ceiling decoration from throne room of Louis XV (1752-54)

In 1808 Napoleon decided to install his throne in the former bedroom of the kings of France from Henry IV to Louis XVI, on the place where the royal bed had been. Under the Ancien régime, the King's bed was a symbol of royal authority in France and was saluted by courtiers who passed by it. Napoleon wanted to show the continuity of his Empire with the past monarchies of France. The majority of the carved wood ceiling, the lower part of the wood panelling, and the doors date to the reign of Louis XIII. The ceiling directly over the throne was made at the end of the reign of Louis XIV. Louis XV created a new chimney, sculpted wooden medallions near the fireplace, the designs over the doors, and the fine carved woodwork facing the throne (1752–54). He also had the ceiling painted white and gilded and decorated with mosaics, to match the ceiling of the bedroom of the Queen.

Napoleon added the standards with his initial and the Imperial eagle. The decoration around the throne was originally designed in 1804 by Jacob-Desmalter for the Château de Saint-Cloud, and the throne itself, made in 1804, came from the Tuileries Palace.

The chimney was originally decorated with a portrait of Louis XIII painted by Philippe de Champaigne, which was burned in 1793 during the French Revolution. Napoleon replaced it with a portrait of himself, by Robert Lefèvre. In 1834, King Louis-Philippe took down Napoleon's picture and replaced with another of Louis XIII, from a painter of the school of Champaigne.

=== Council Chamber ===
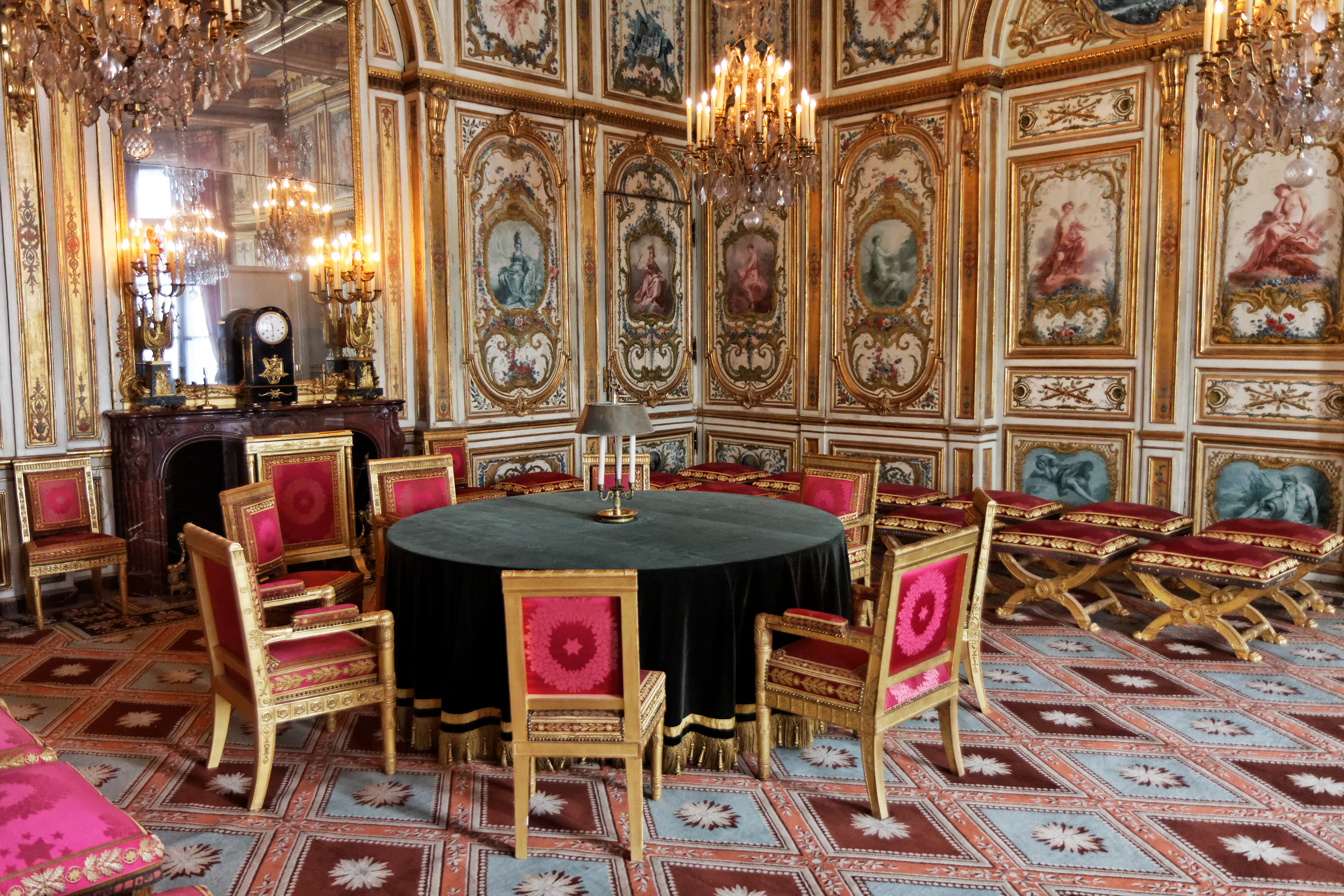
The Council Chamber

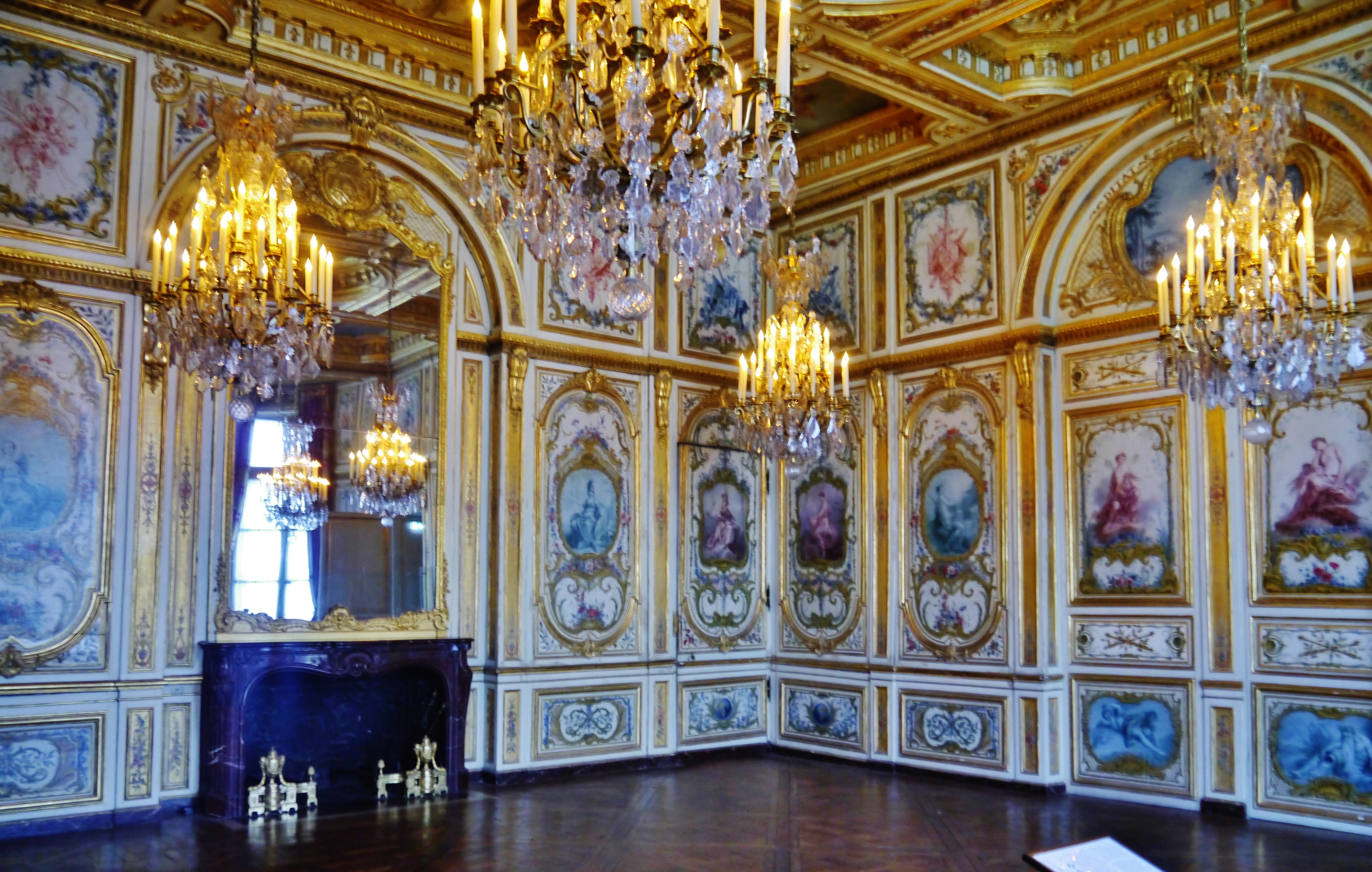
Council Chamber decoration (1751-54)

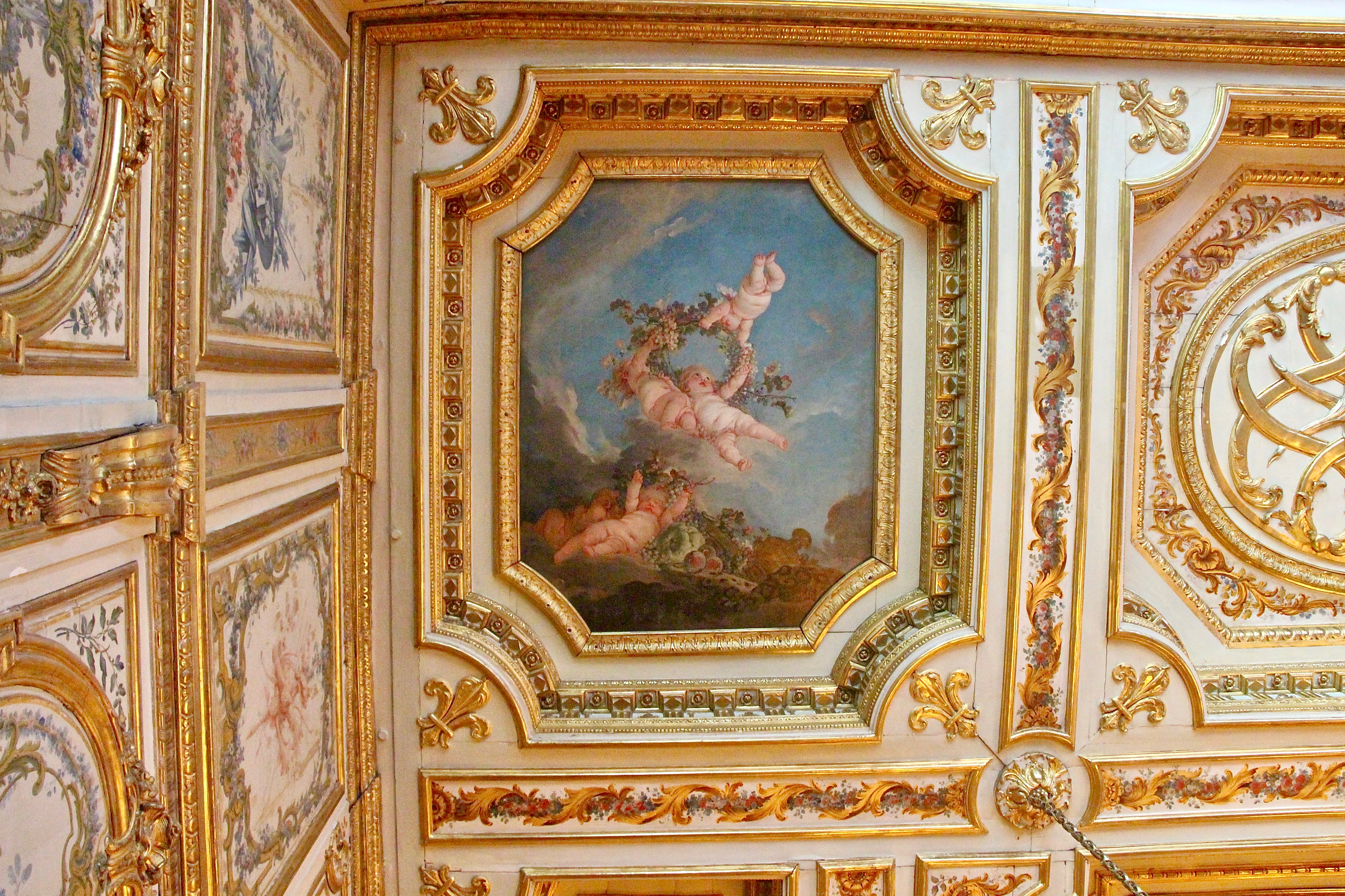
A ceiling painting by Francois Boucher (1751-1754)

The Council Chamber, where French Kings and later the Emperors Napoleon I and Napoleon III met their closest advisors, was close to the Throne Room. It was originally the office of Francis I, and was decorated with painted wooden panels with illustrations by Primaticcio depicting the virtues and the heroes of antiquity. The room was enlarged under Louis XIV, and the decorator, Claude Audran, followed the same theme.

The room was extensively redecorated between 1751 and 1754 by the architect Ange-Jacques Gabriel, with arcades and wooded panels illustrating the Virtues, and allegories of the seasons and the elements, painted by Jean-Baptiste Marie Pierre and Carle van Loo, the latter painted his scenes in blue monochrome, while Pierre used pink monochrome. The painter Alexis Peyrotte added another series of medallions on the upper walls depicting floral themes, the sciences and arts.

The five paintings on the vaulted ceiling were the work of François Boucher, and illustrate the Four Seasons and the sun beginning his journey and chasing away the night. A half-rotonda on the garden side of the room was added by Louis XV in 1773, with a painted ceiling by Louis-Jean-François Lagrenée depicting Glory surrounded by his children.

The room was used as a council chamber by Napoleon I, and the furnishings are from that time. The armchairs at the table for the ministers are by Marcion (1806) and the folding chairs for advisors were designed by Jacob-Desmalter (1808).

== Apartment of Napoleon ==
In 1804 Napoleon decided that he wanted his own apartments within the palace, separate from the old royal apartments. He took over a suite of six rooms which had been created in 1786 for Louis XVI, next to the Gallery of Francis I, and had them redecorated in the Empire style. The old apartment included a dressing room (cabinet de toilette), study, library, and bath.

=== Emperor's bedchamber ===
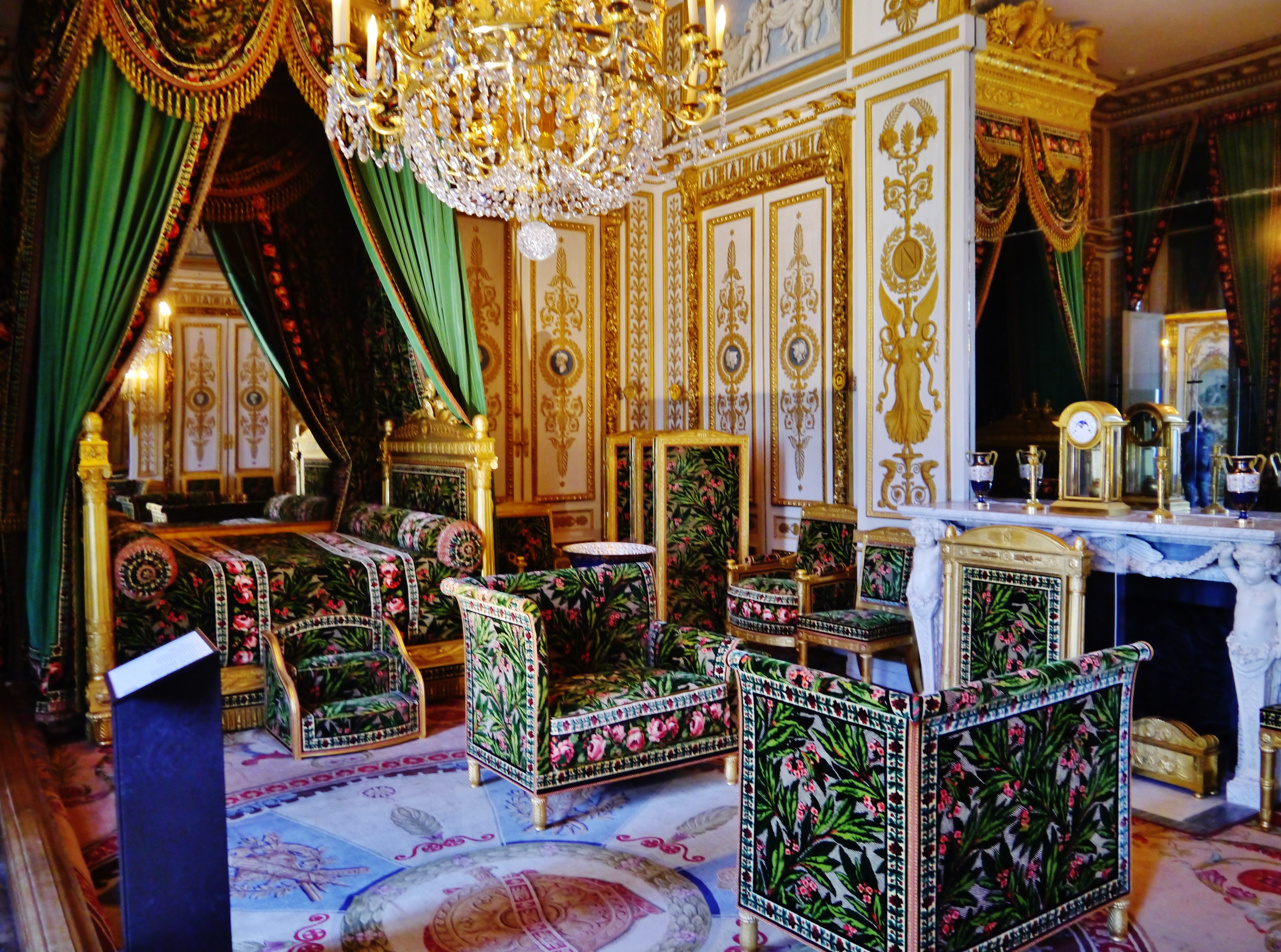
Bedroom of the Emperor Napoleon (1808–1814)

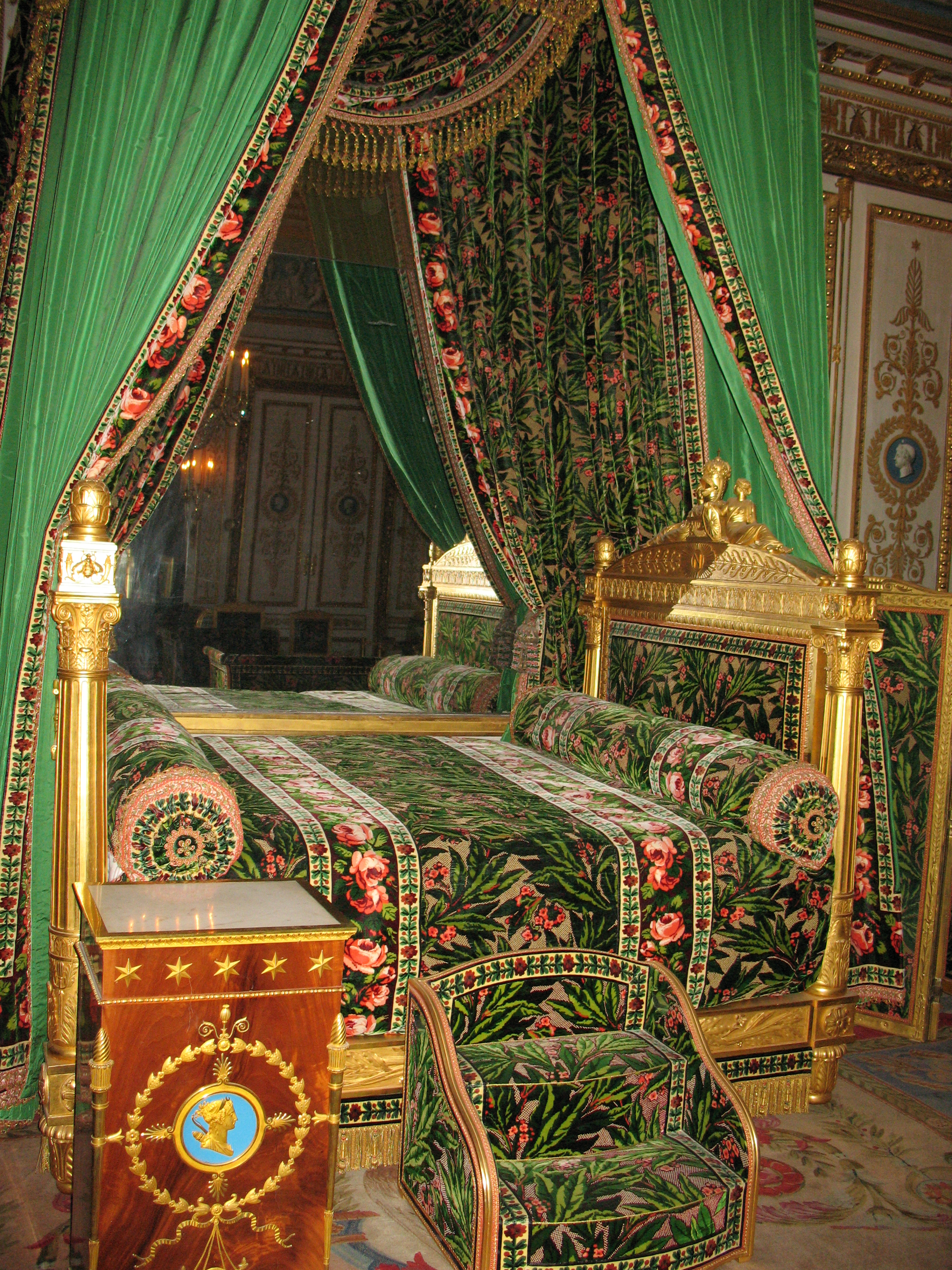
The bed of the Emperor

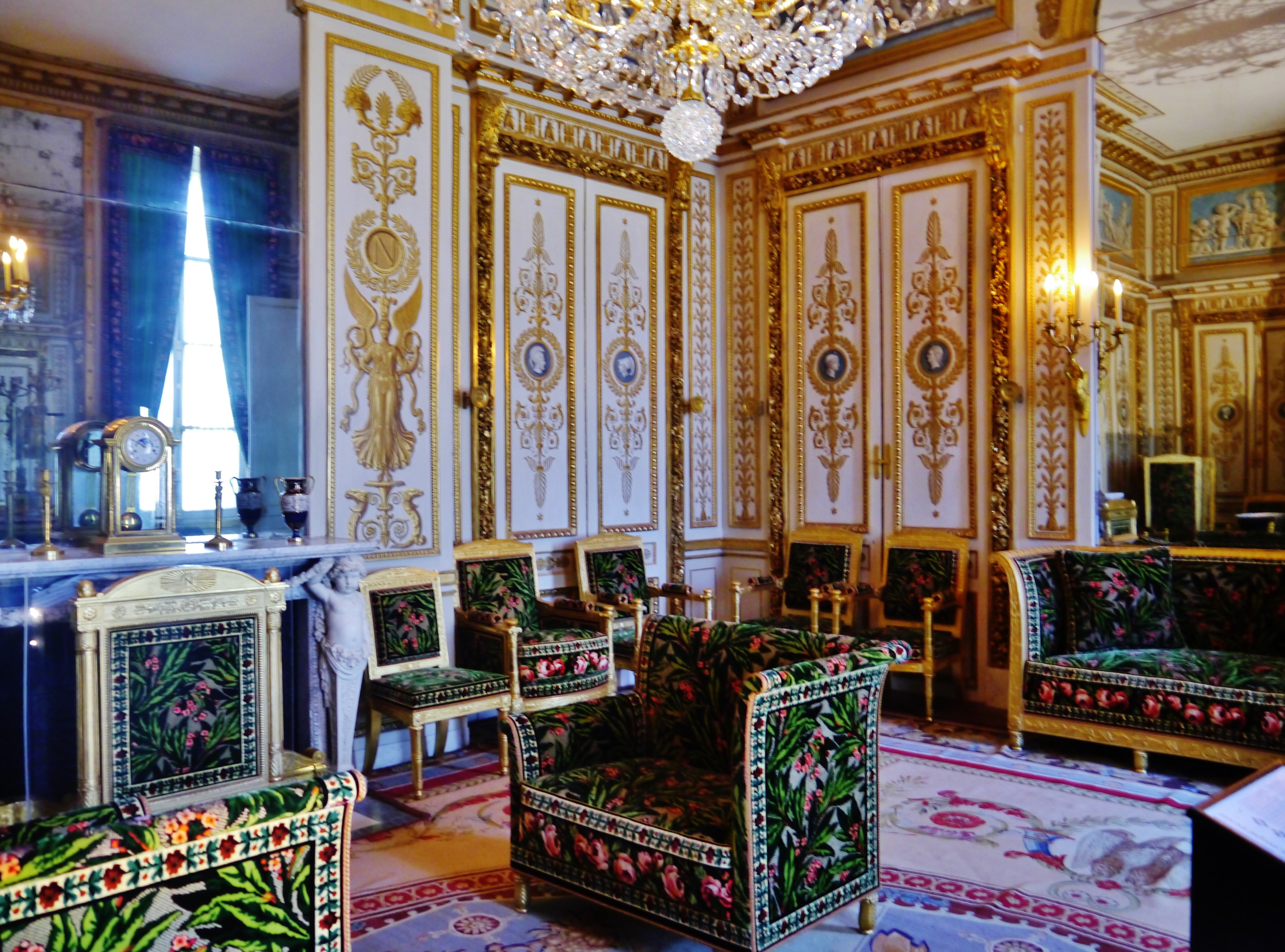
Wall panelling carved by Laplace for Louis XV, painted for Napoleon I with emblems of the Emperor

Beginning in 1808, Napoleon had his bedchamber relocated the former dressing room of the King. From this room, using a door hidden behind the drapery to the right of the bed, Napoleon could go directly to his private library or to the offices on the ground floor.

Much of the original decor was unchanged from the time of Louis XVI; the fireplaces, the carved wooden panels sculpted by Pierre-Joseph LaPlace and the sculpture over the door by Sauvage remained as they were. The walls were painted with Imperial emblems in gold on white by Frederic-Simon Moench. The bed, made especially for the Emperor, was the summit of the Empire style; it was crowned with an imperial eagle and decorated with allegorical sculptures representing Glory, Justice, and Abundance. The Emperor had a special carpet made by Sallandrouze in the shape of the cross of the Legion of Honor; the branches of the cross alternate with symbols of military and civilian attributes. The chairs near the fireplace were specially designed, with one side higher than the other, to contain the heat from the fire while allowing the occupants to see the decorations of the fireplace.

The painting on the ceiling of the room was added later, after the downfall of Napoleon, by Louis XVIII. Painted by Jean-Baptiste Regnault, it is an allegory representing The clemency of the King halting justice in its course.

=== Other rooms in the Emperor's apartment ===
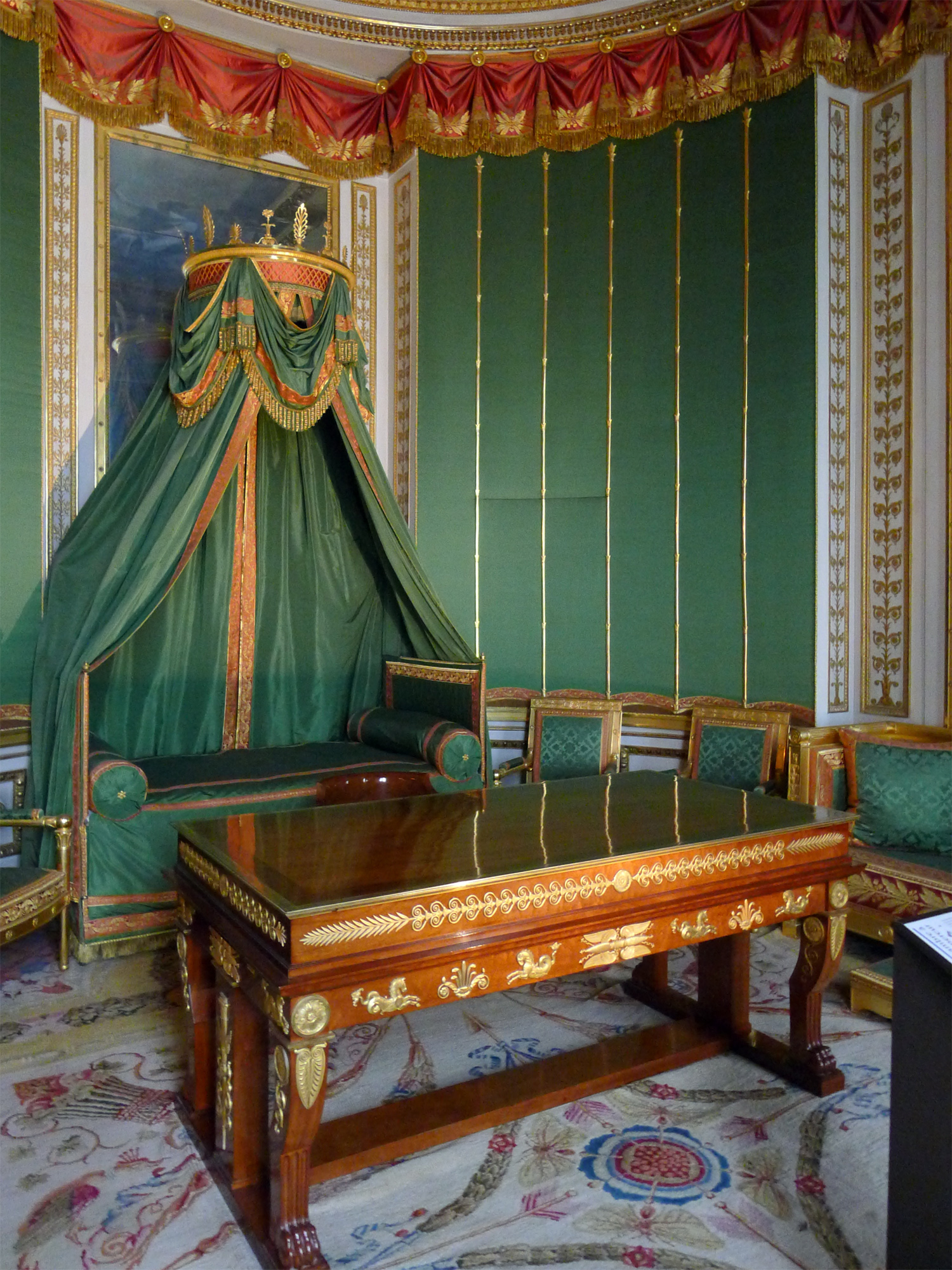
The Study, With a camp bed, where Napoleon could work late at night

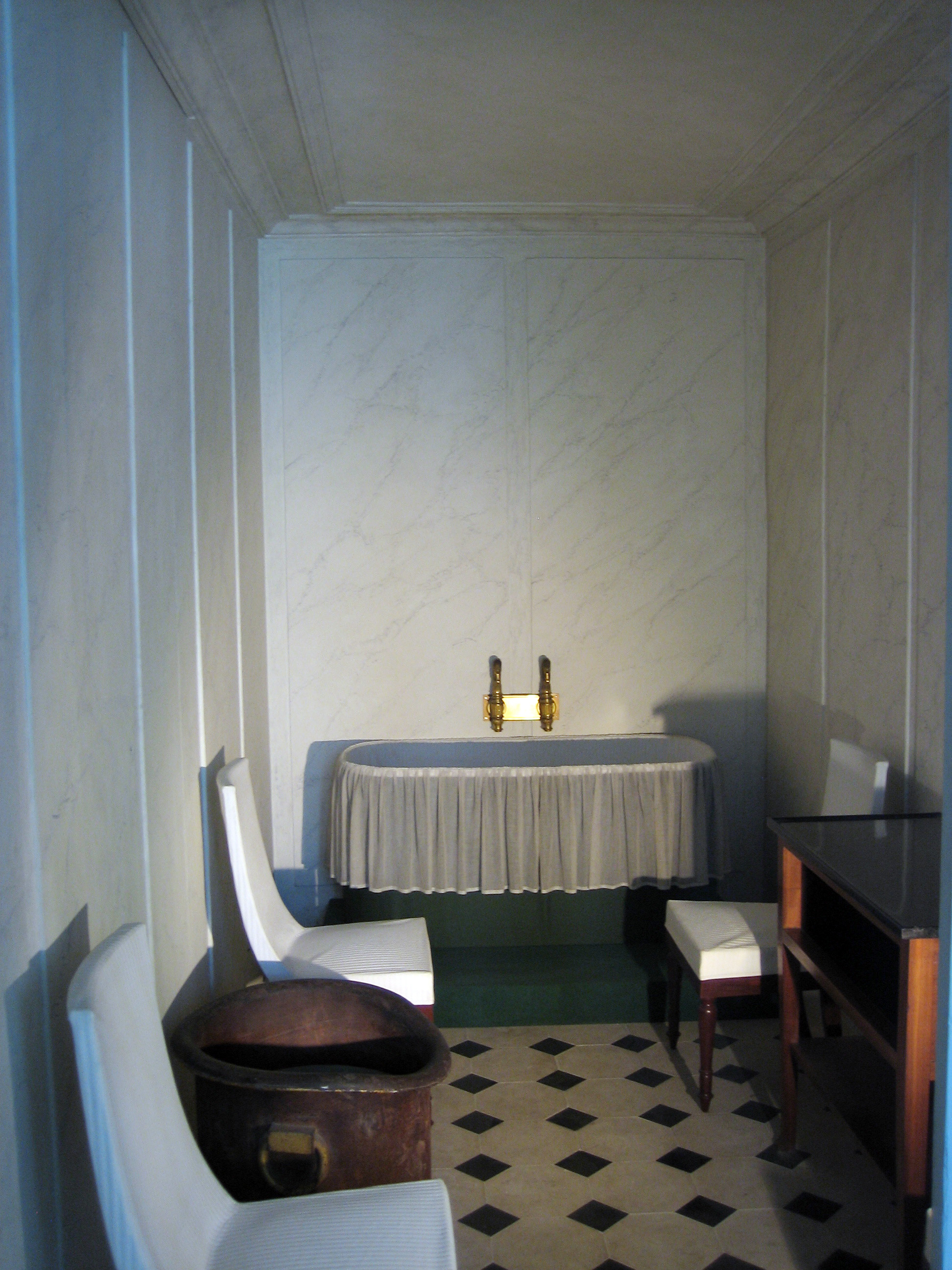
Bathroom of the Emperor, with cotton-skirted bathtub and foot basin

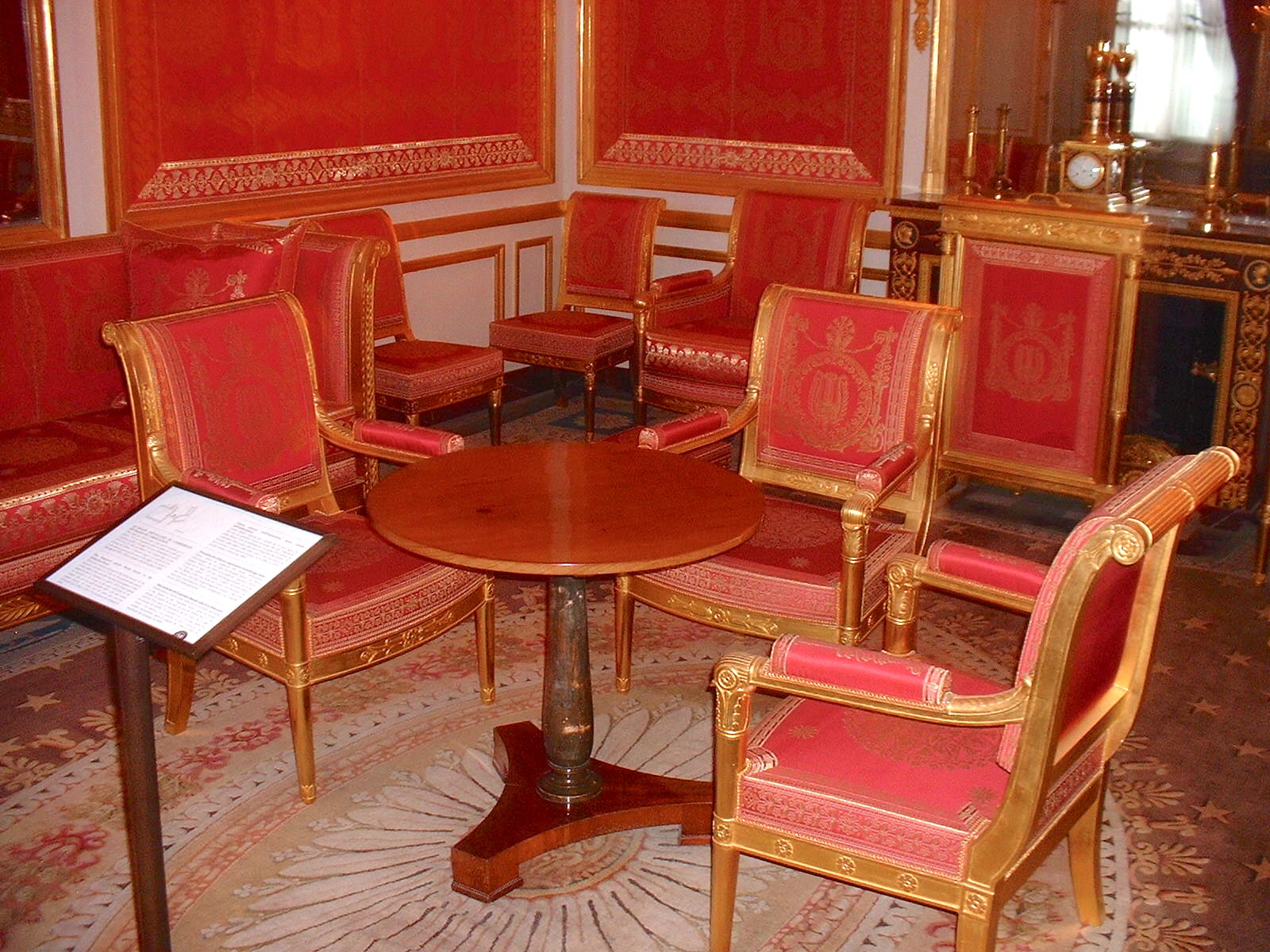
The table where Napoleon signed his abdication at Fontainebleau on 4 April 1814, before his exile to Elba

The small bedchamber often served as Napoleon's work room. In 1811 he added the camp bed, similar to the bed he used on his military campaigns. He could rest briefly, then take a back stairway to continue working in the library or map room on the floor below.

The private salon or study of the Emperor was simply furnished and decorated. It was in this room, on the small table on display, that the Emperor signed his abdication in 1814.

The small and simple bathroom of the Emperor had a tinned copper bathtub surrounded by a simple cotton skirt, where he could soak in hot water. It also had a varnished metal tub where he could soak his feet.

== Apartment of the Pope and the Queen-Mothers ==
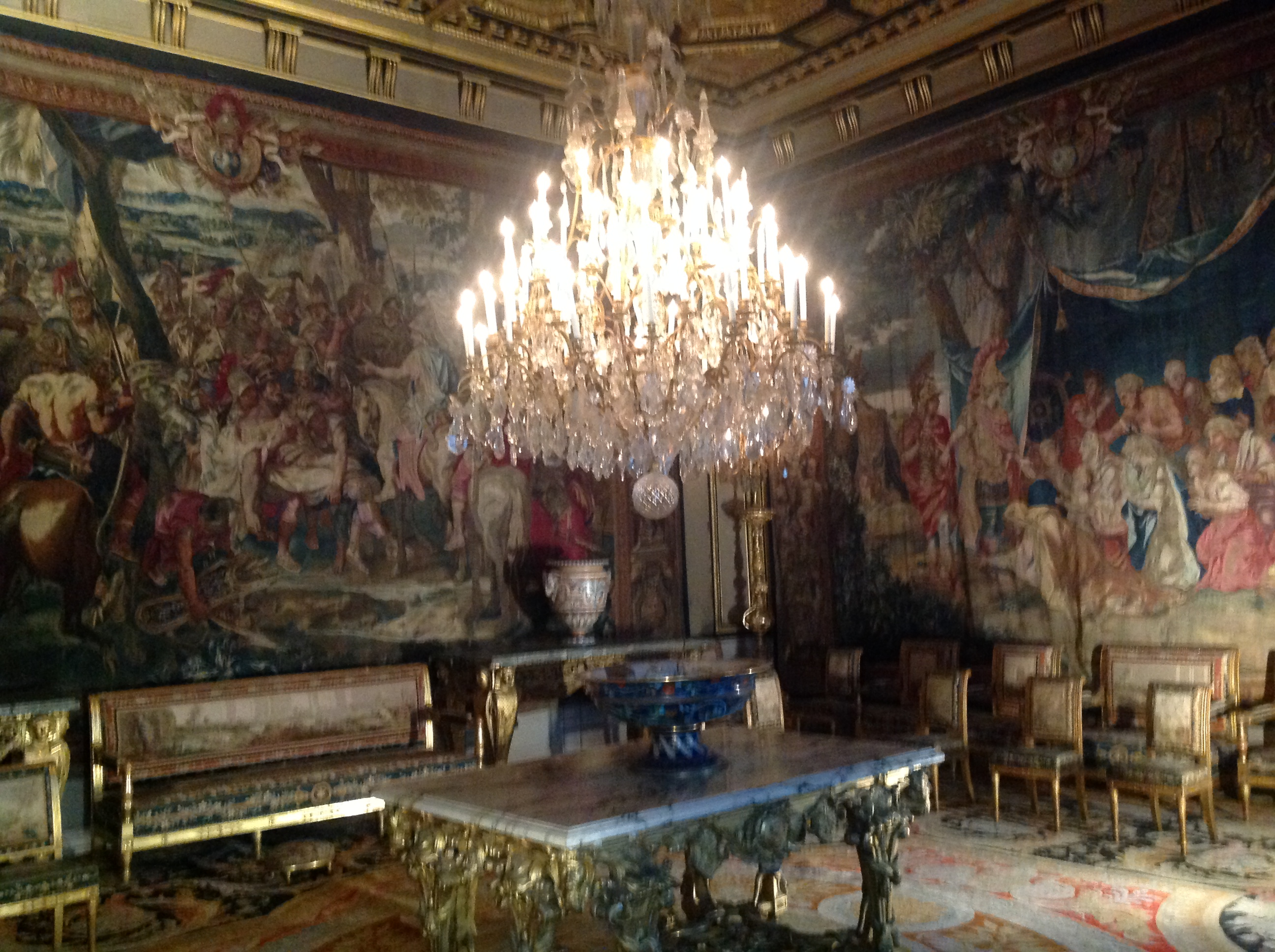
Antechamber of the Bedroom of the Queen Mother

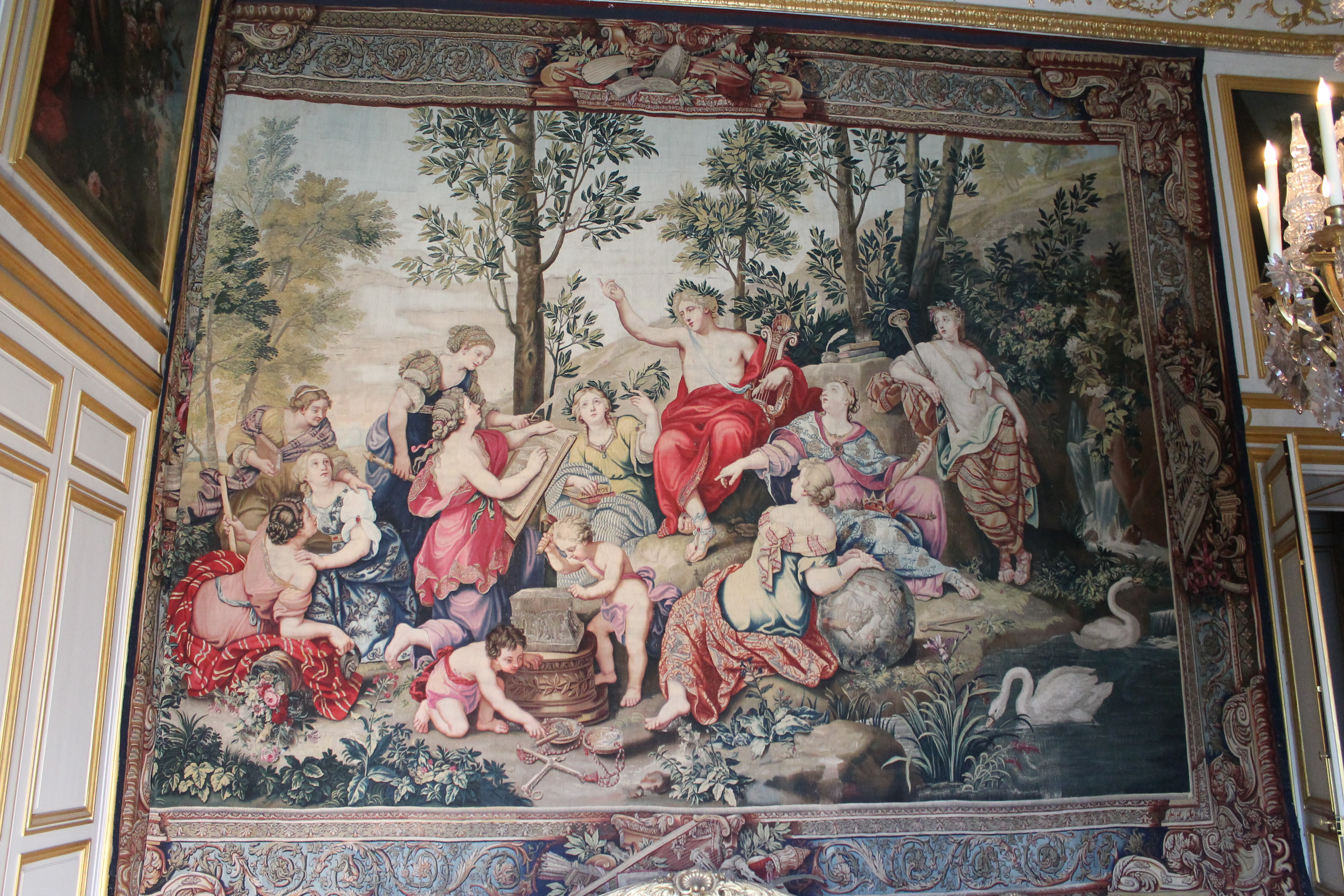
Tapestry in the antechamber of the bedroom of the Queen Mother (Mid-17th century)

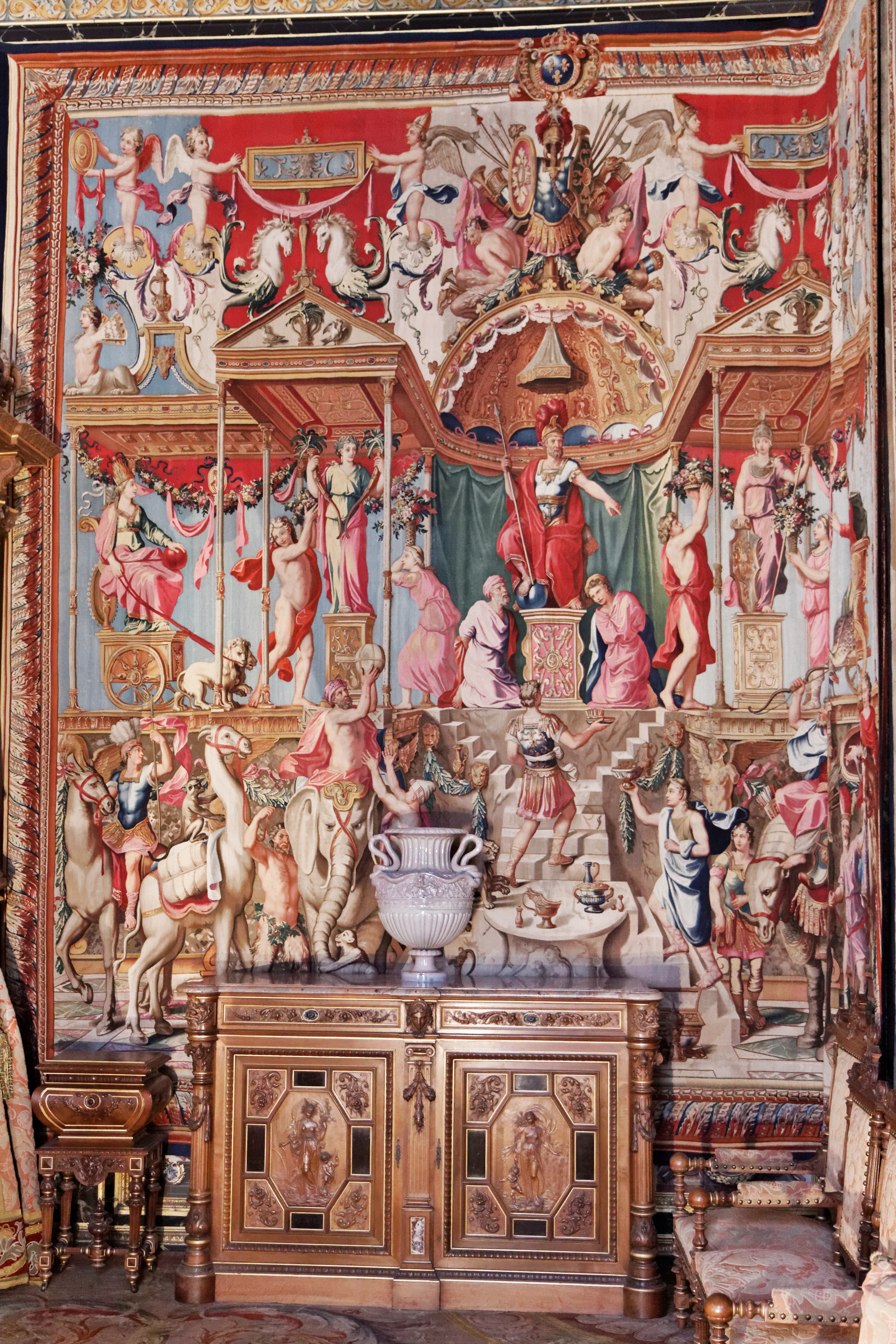
Tapestries in the bedroom of the Queen Mother

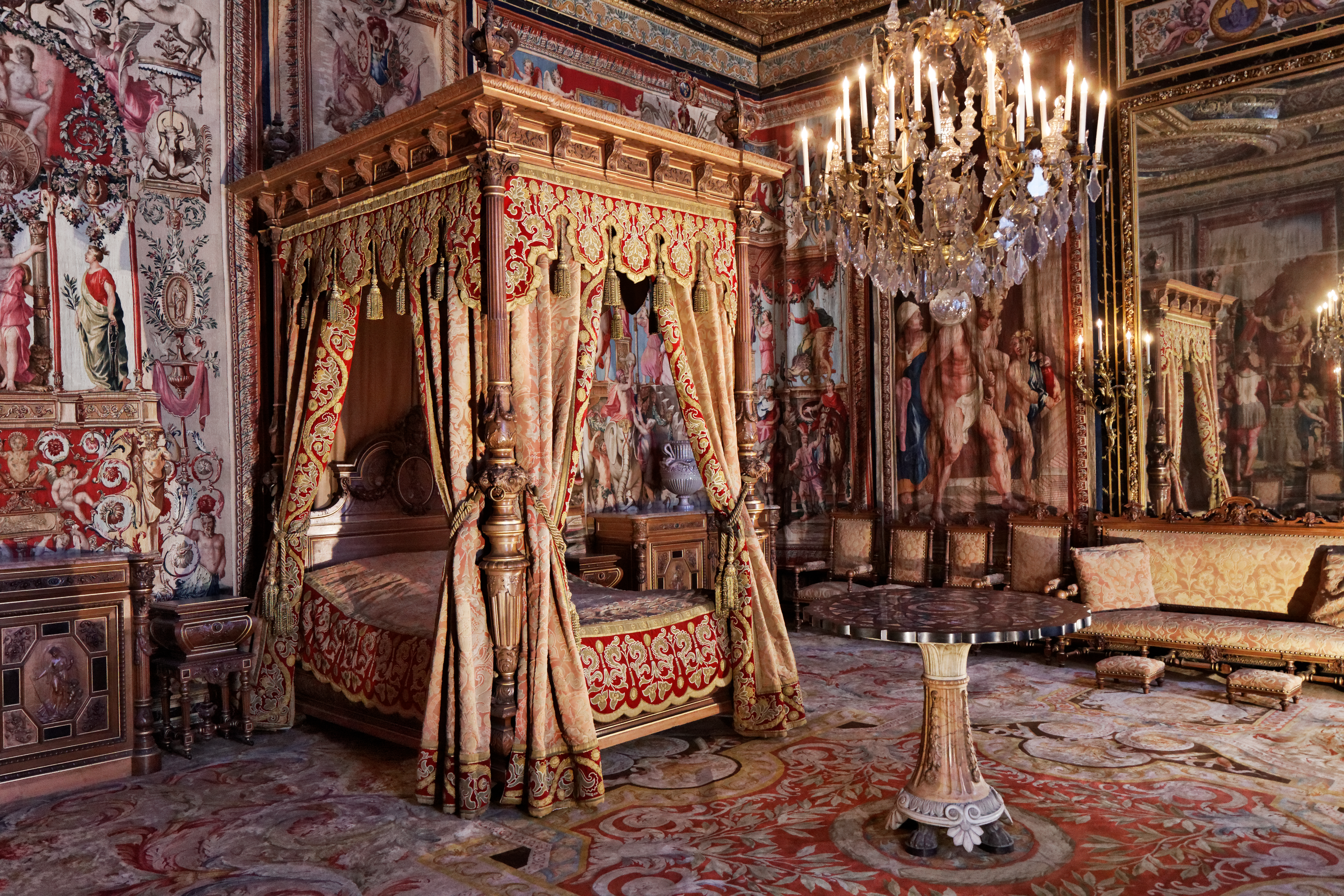
Bedroom of the Queen-Mother Anne of Austria (Mid-17th century)

The apartment of the Pope, located on the first floor of the wing of the Queen Mothers and of the Gros Pavillon, takes its name from the 1804 visit of Pope Pius VII, who stayed there on his way to Paris to crown Napoleon the Emperor of France. He stayed there again, involuntarily, under the close supervision of Napoleon from 1812 to 1814.

It was originally designed to be the bedroom of Henry IV, but after his assassination, it became instead the apartment of his widow, the Queen Mothers Marie de' Medici and Anne of Austria. It was also the home of Louis, Grand Dauphin, the oldest son of Louis XIV. In the 18th century it was used by the daughters of Louis XV, and then by the Count of Provence, the brother of Louis XVI. During the First Empire it was used by Louis Bonaparte, the brother of Napoleon, and his wife Queen Hortense de Beauharnais, the daughter of the Empress Joséphine. During the reign of Louis-Philippe, it was used by his eldest son, Ferdinand Philippe, Duke of Orléans. During the Second Empire, it was occupied by Stéphanie de Beauharnais, the adopted niece of Napoleon I. It was restored in 1859–1861, and used thereafter for guests of high rank. It was originally two apartments, which were divided or joined over the years depending upon its occupants.

Other notable guests in the apartment included James II, the deposed King of England. and the Russian czar Peter the Great (1717).

The Salon de Reception was the antechamber to the bedroom of Anne of Austria, wife of Louis XIII and mother of Louis XIV. It features a gilded and sculpted ceiling divided into seven compartments, representing the sun and the known planets, along with smaller compartments for military trophies; it was created in 1558 by Ambroise Perret for the bedroom of Henry II in the Pavilion des Poeles, a section of the château that was later destroyed. Anne had it moved to the room and decorated with her own emblems, including a pelican. The wood paneling in the room is probably from the same period.

The decor of the bedroom dates largely to the 1650s; it includes grotesque paintings in compartments on the ceiling, attributed to Charles Errard; richly carved wood paneling featuring oak leaves and putti; and paintings over the doors of Anne of Austria costumed as Minerva and Maria Theresa of Spain costumed as Abundance, both painted by Gilbert de Sève. The bedroom was modified in the 18th century by the addition of a new fireplace (about 1700) and sculptured borders of cascades of flowers around the mirrors added in 1784. During the Second Empire, painted panels imitating the style of the 17th century were added above the mirrors and between the mirrors and the doors.

== Chapel of the Trinity (17th century) ==
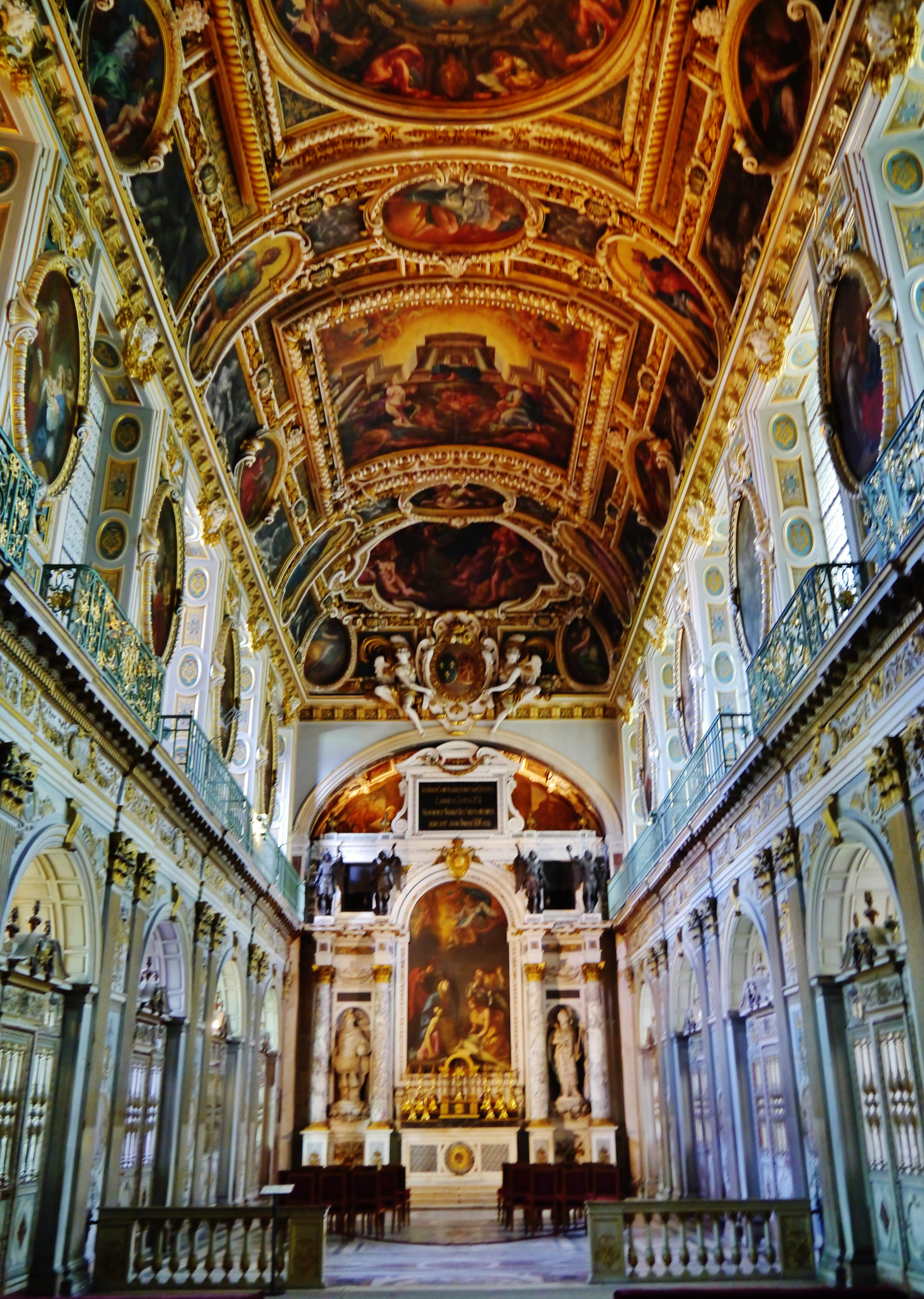
Trinity Chapel

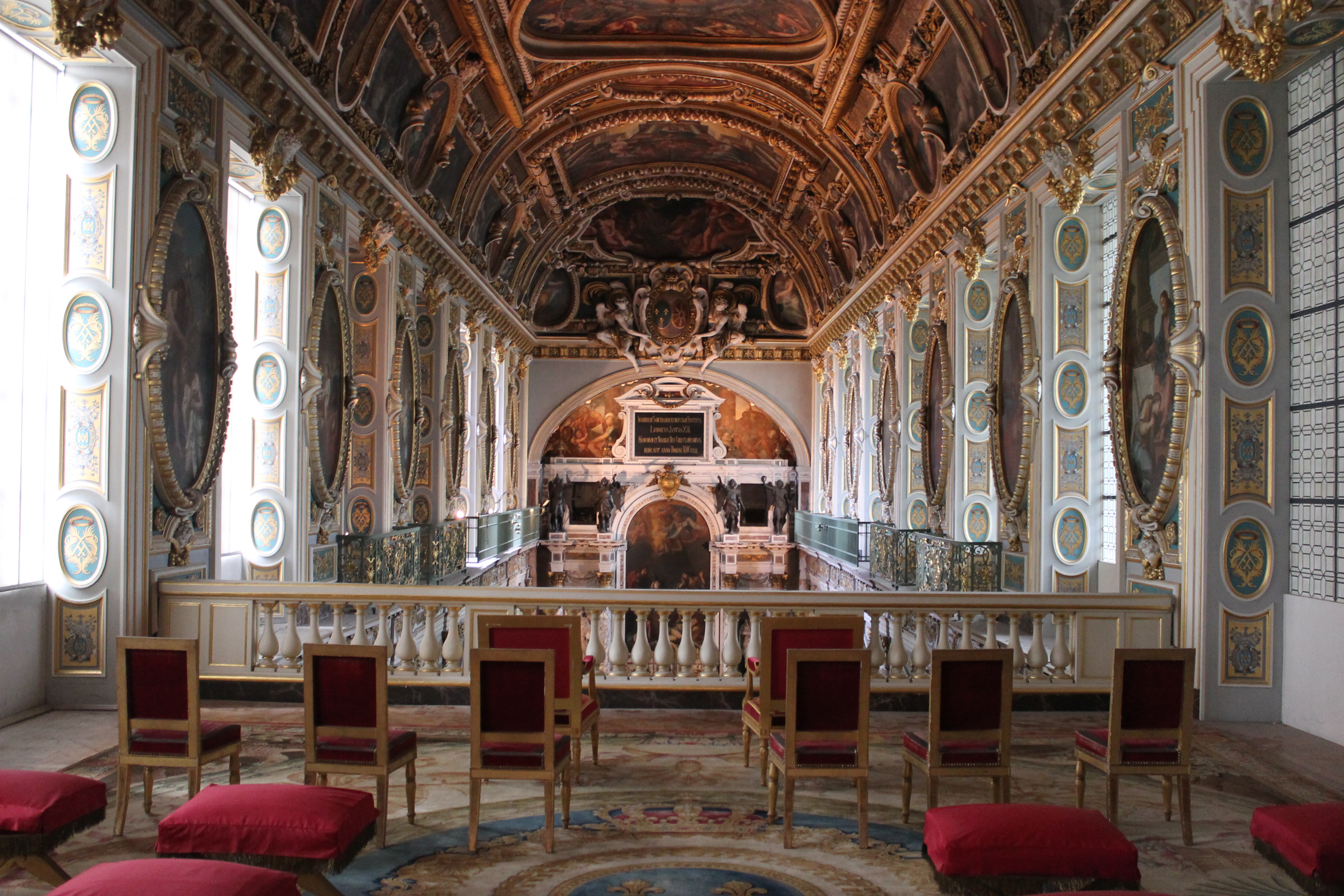
The royal tribune or gallery

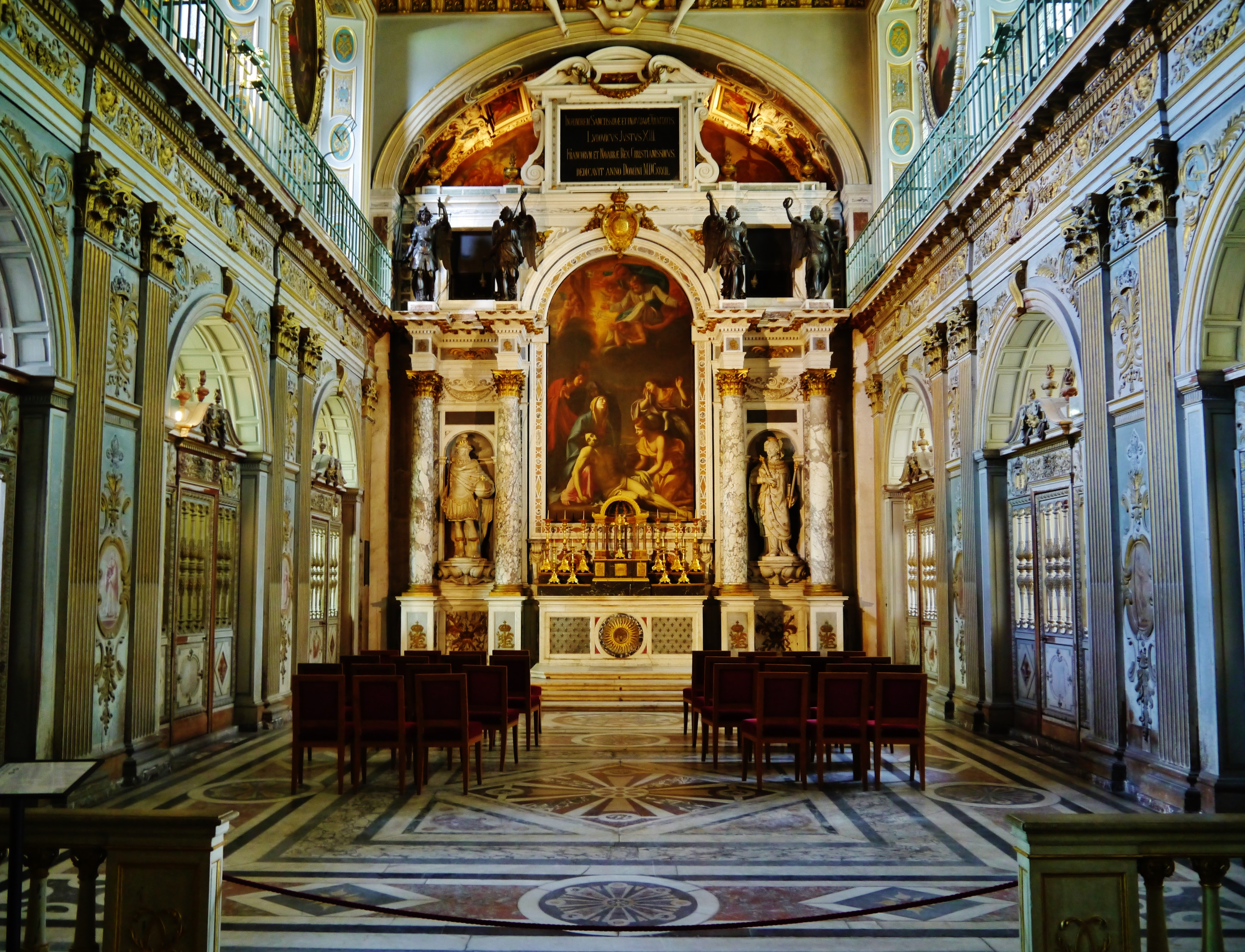
The Altar

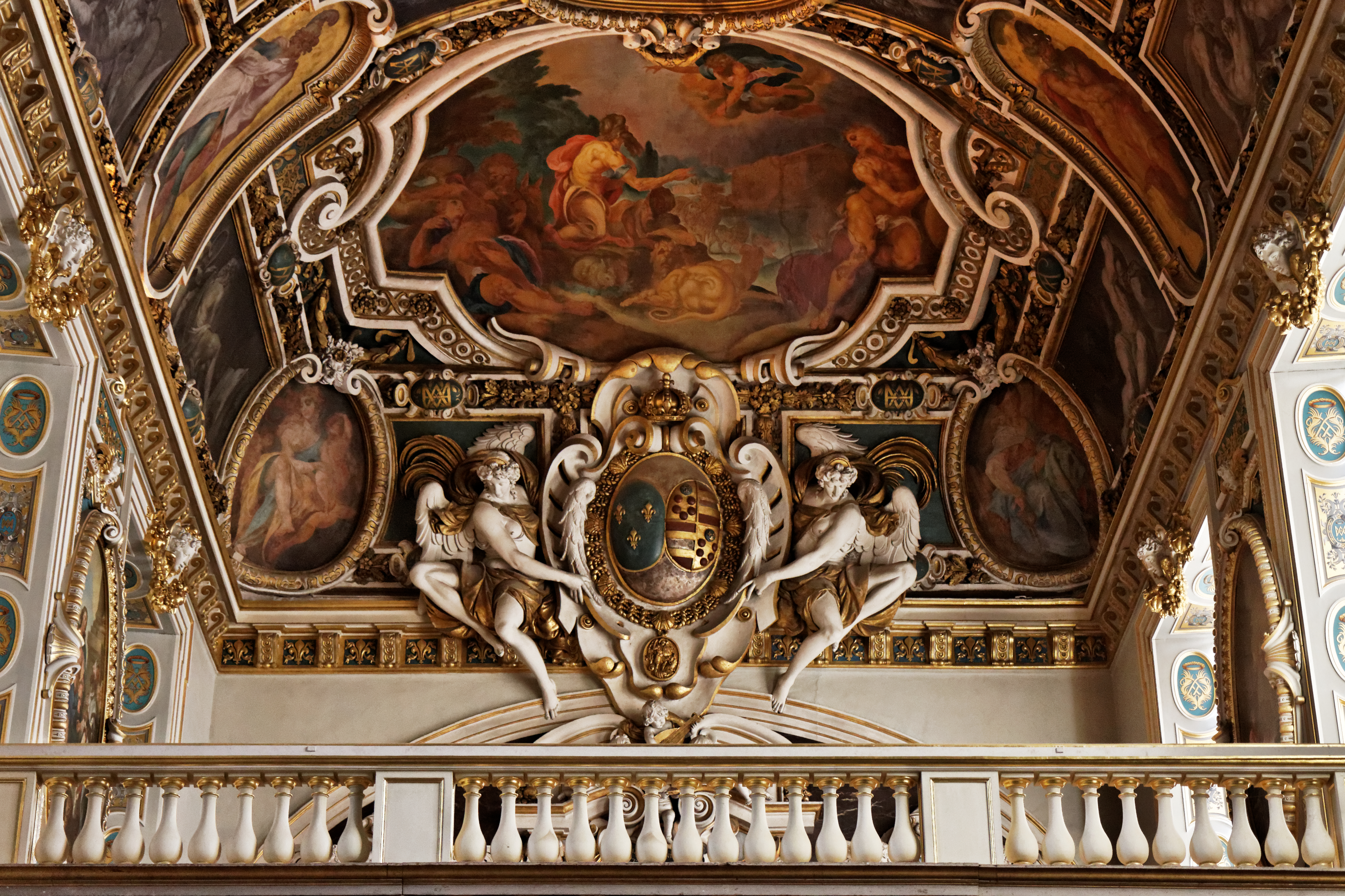
Ornament over the chapel gallery with the coats of arms of France and of the Medici Family

The Chapel of the Trinity was begun at the end of the reign of Francis I to replace the old chapel of the convent of the Trinitarians. It was finished under Henry II, but was without decoration until 1608, when the painter Martin Freminet was commissioned to design frescoes for the ceiling and walls. The sculptor Barthèlemy Tremblay created the vaults of the ceiling out of stucco and sculpture. The paintings of Freminet in the central vaults depict the redemption of Man, from the appearance of God to Noah at the launching of the Ark (Over the tribune) to the Annunciation. They surrounded these with smaller paintings depicting the ancestors of the Virgin Mary, the kings of Judah, the Patriarchs announcing the coming of Christ, and the Virtues. Between 1613 and 1619 Freminet and Tremblay added paintings in stucco frames between the windows on the sides of the chapel, depicting the life of Christ. Freminet died in 1619 and work did not resume until 1628.

The Trinity chapel, like Sainte-Chapelle in Paris other royal chapels, had an upper section or tribune, where the King and his family sat, with a separate entrance; and a lower part, where the rest of the Court was placed. Beginning in 1628, the side chapels were decorated with iron gates and carved wood panelling, and the Florentine sculptor Francesco Bordoni began work on the marble altar. The figure to the left depicts Charlemagne, with the features of Henry II, while the figure on the right depicts Louis IX, or Saint Louis, with the features of Louis XIII, his patron. Bordoni also designed the multicolored marble pavement before the altar and the on the walls of the nave. The painting of the Holy Trinity over the altar, by Jean Dubois the Elder, was added in 1642. In the mid-17th century the craftsman Anthony Girault made the sculpted wooden doors of the nave. while the Jean Gobert made the doors of the tribune where the royal family worshipped.

In 1741, the royal tribune was enlarged, while ornate balconies of wrought iron were added between the royal tribune and the simpler balconies used by the musicians and those who chanted the mass. In 1779, under Louis XVI, the frescoes of Freminet illustrating the life of Christ, which had deteriorated with time, were replaced by new paintings on the same theme. The paintings were done in the same style by about a dozen painters from the Royal Academy of Painting and Sculpture.

On 5 September 1725, the chapel was the setting for the wedding of Louis XV and Marie Leszczyńska. Napoleon III was baptized there on 4 November 1810, and Ferdinand Philippe, Duke of Orléans, the son of King Louis-Philippe, was married there to Duchess Helene of Mecklenburg-Schwerin on 30 May 1837.

Under Napoleon, the old tabernacle of the chapel, which had been removed during the Revolution, was replaced by a new one designed by the architect Maximilien Joseph Hurtault. Beginning in 1824, the chapel underwent a program of major renovation and restoration that lasted for six years. The twelve paintings of the life of Christ were removed, as well as the gates to the side chapels. During the Second Empire, the wood panelling of side chapels was replaced. The restoration was not completed until the second half of the 20th century, when the twelve paintings, which had been scattered to different museums, were brought together again and restored in their stucco frames. Between 1772 and 1774, a small organ made by François-Henri Cilquot was installed on the left side of the chapel, near the altar.

=== Room of the Guards (begun 1570s, redone in 19th century) ===
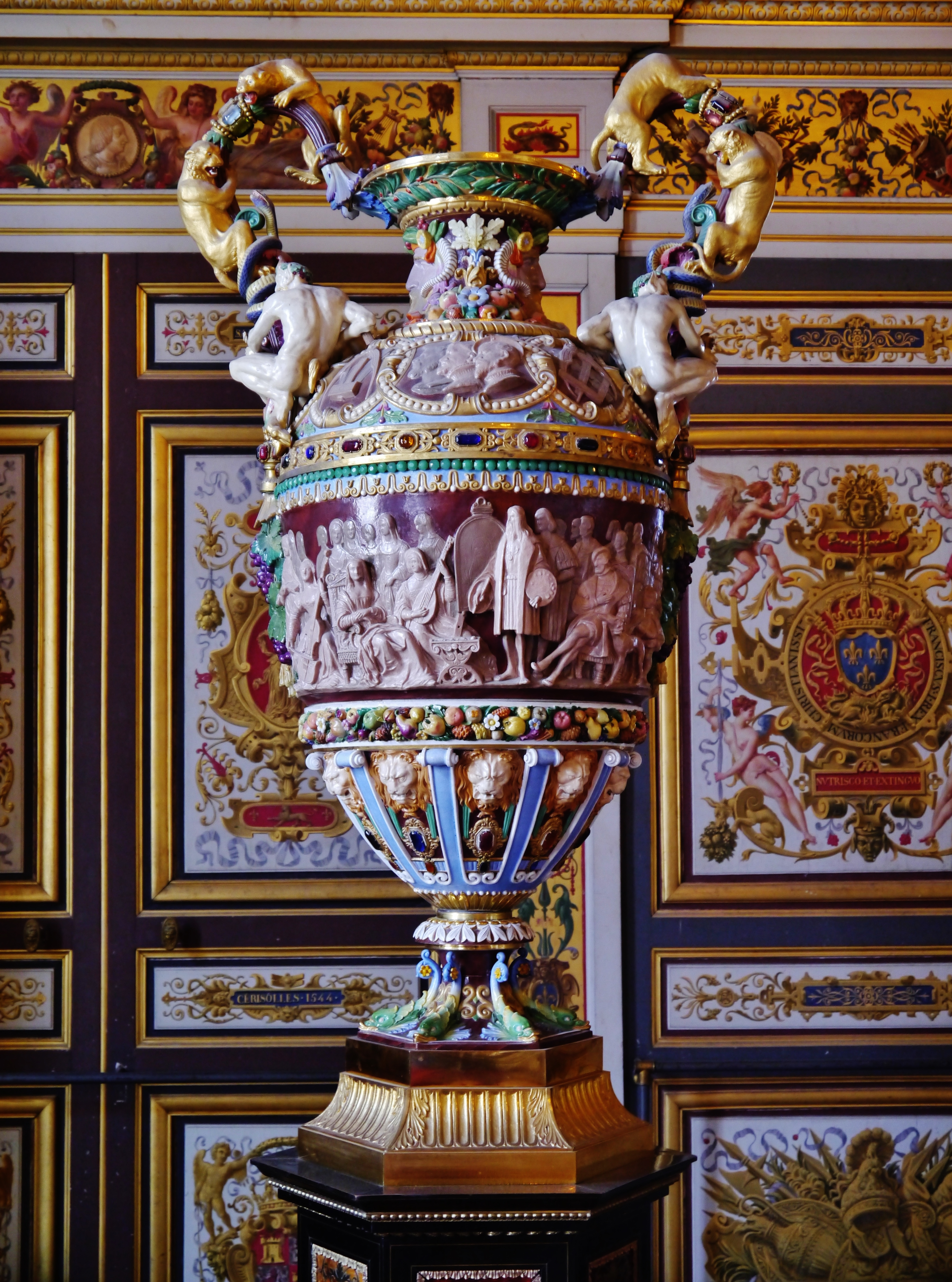
Vase in the Room of the Guards (1832)

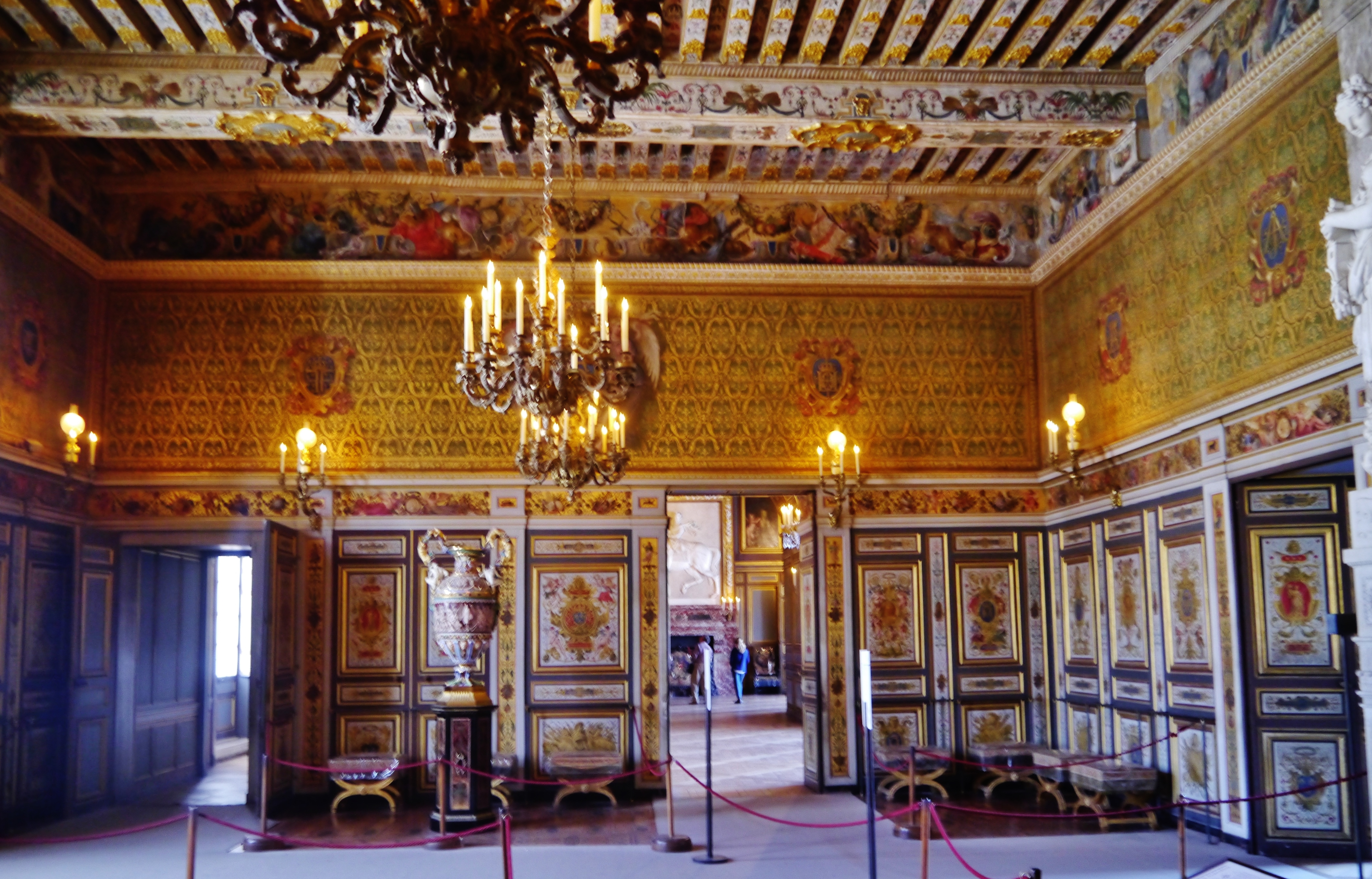
The Room of the Guards

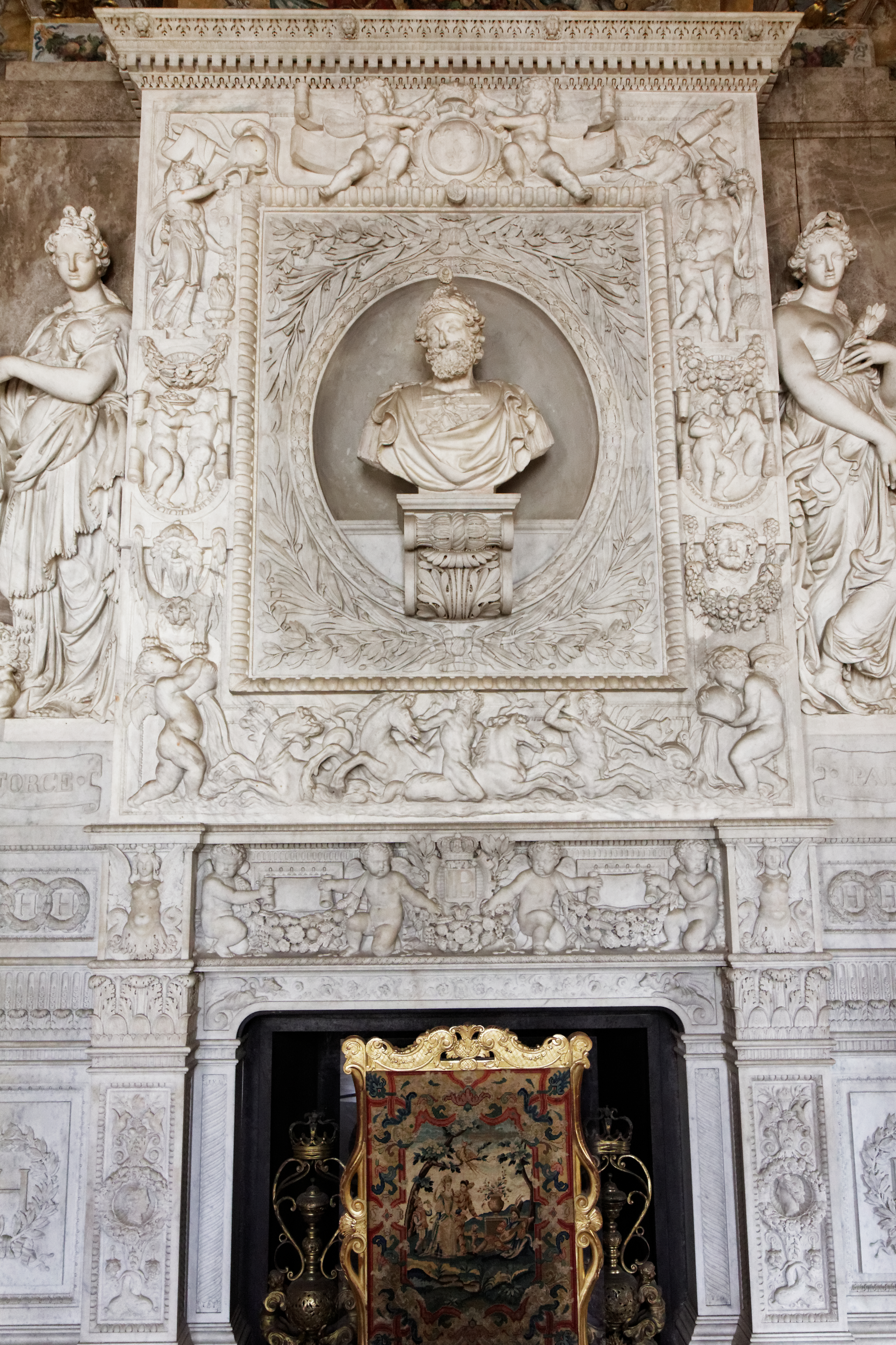
Fireplace in the Room of the Guards (1836)

A room for the guards was always located next to the royal bedchambers. The Salle des Gardes was built during the reign of Charles IX. Some traces of the original decor remain from the 1570s, including the vaulted ceiling and a frieze of military trophies attributed to Ruggiero d'Ruggieri. In the 19th century Louis Philippe turned the room into a salon and redecorated it with a new parquet floor of exotic woods echoing the design of the ceiling, and a monumental fireplace (1836), which incorporates pieces of ornament from demolished rooms from 15th and early 16th century. The bust of Henry IV, attributed to Mathieu Jacquet, is from that period, as are the two figures on either side of the fireplace. The sculpted frame around the bust, by Pierre Bontemps, was originally in the bedchamber of Henry II. The decorations added by Louis Philippe include a large vase decorated with Renaissance themes, made by the Sèvres porcelain manufactory in 1832. During the reign of Napoleon III, the hall was used as a dining room.

=== Gallery of Diana ===
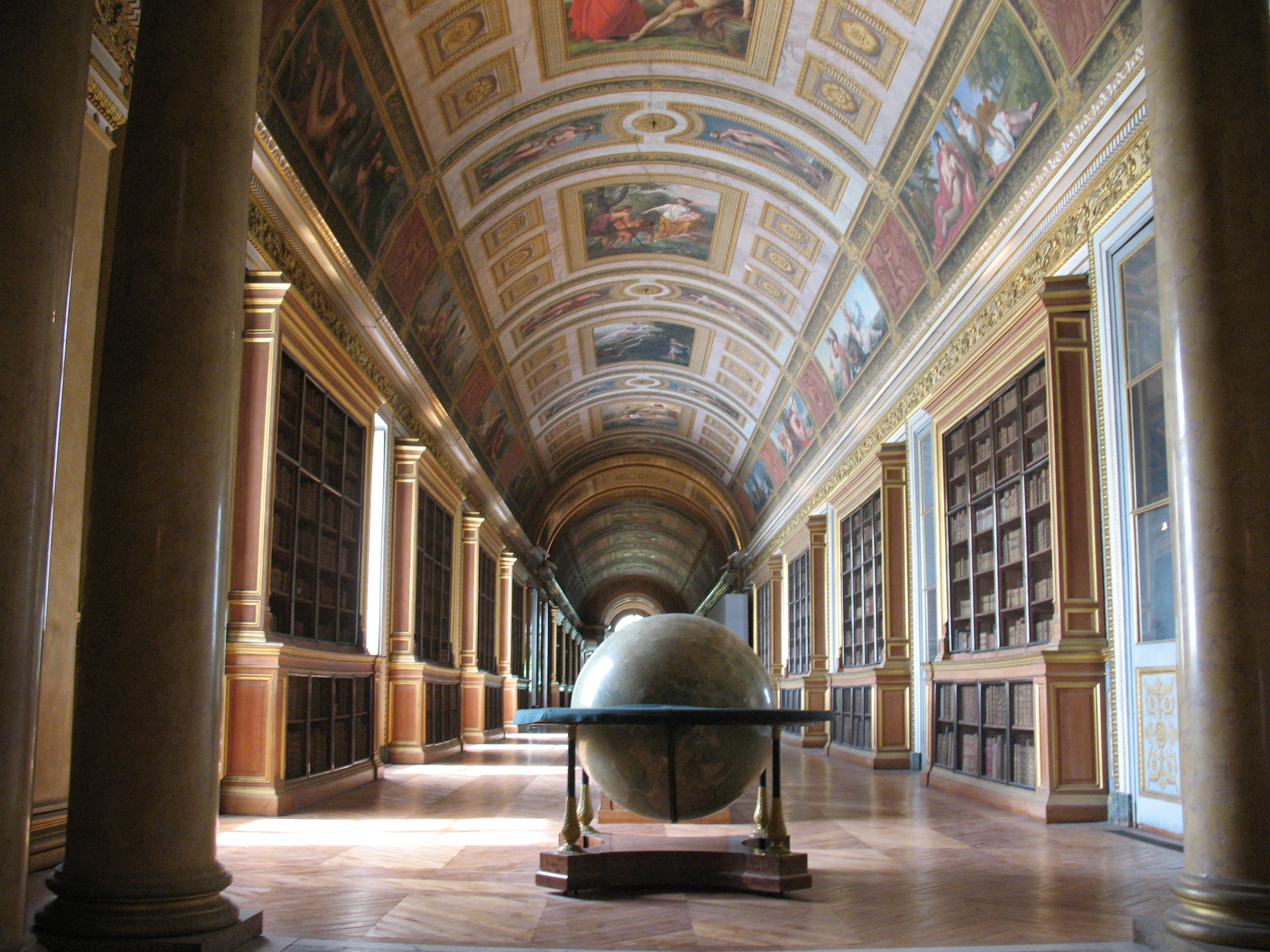
The Gallery of Diana (17th and 19th century)

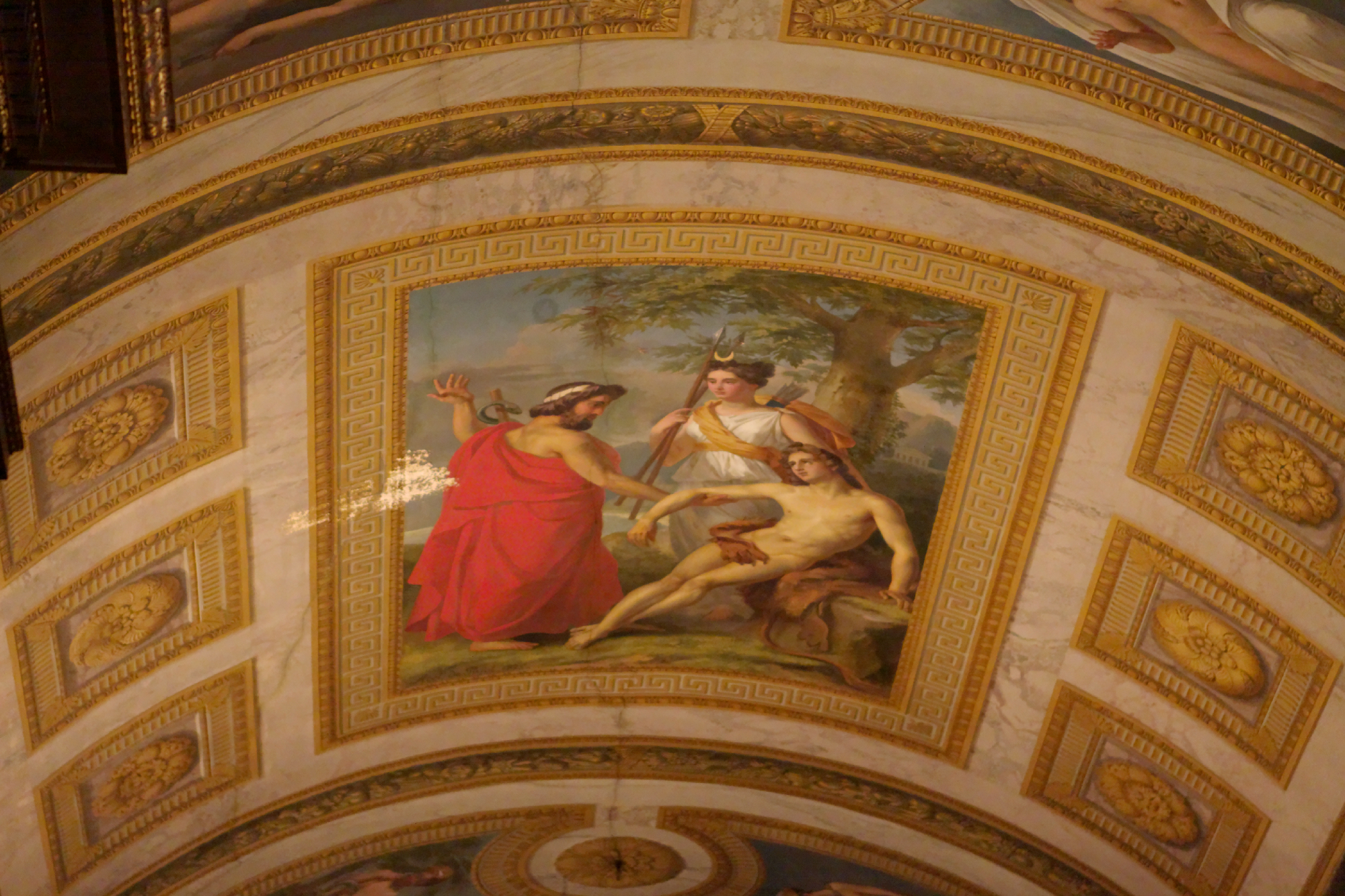
Scenes from life of the Goddess Diana (1605)

The Gallery of Diana, an eighty-meter (242.4 feet) long corridor now lined with bookcases, was created by Henry IV at the beginning of the 17th century as a place for the Queen to promenade. The paintings on the vaulted ceiling, painted beginning in 1605 by Ambroise Dubois and his workshop, represented scenes from the myth of Diana, goddess of the Hunt. At the beginning of the 19th century, the gallery was in ruins. In 1810 Napoleon decided to turn it into a gallery devoted to the achievements of his Empire. A few of the paintings still in good condition were removed and put in the Gallery of Plates. The architect Hurtault designed a new plan for the gallery, inspired by the Grande Galerie of the Louvre, featuring paintings on the ceiling illustrating the great events of Napoleon's reign. By 1814 the corridor had been rebuilt and the decorative painted frames painted by Moench and Redouté, but the cycle of paintings on the Empire had not been started, when Napoleon fell from power.

Once the monarchy was restored, King Louis XVIII had the gallery completed in a neoclassical style. A new series of the goddess Diana was done by Merry-Joseph Blondel and Abel de Pujol, using the painted frames prepared for Napoleon's cycle. Paintings were also added along the corridor, illustrating the history of the French monarchy, painted in the Troubador style of the 1820s and 1830s, painted by a team of the leading academic painters. Beginning in 1853, under Napoleon III, the corridor was turned into a library and most of the paintings were removed, with the exception of a large portrait of Henry IV on horseback by Jean-Baptiste Mauzaisse. The large globe near the entrance of the gallery, placed there in 1861, came from the office of Napoleon in the Tuileries Palace.

== Chinese Museum ==
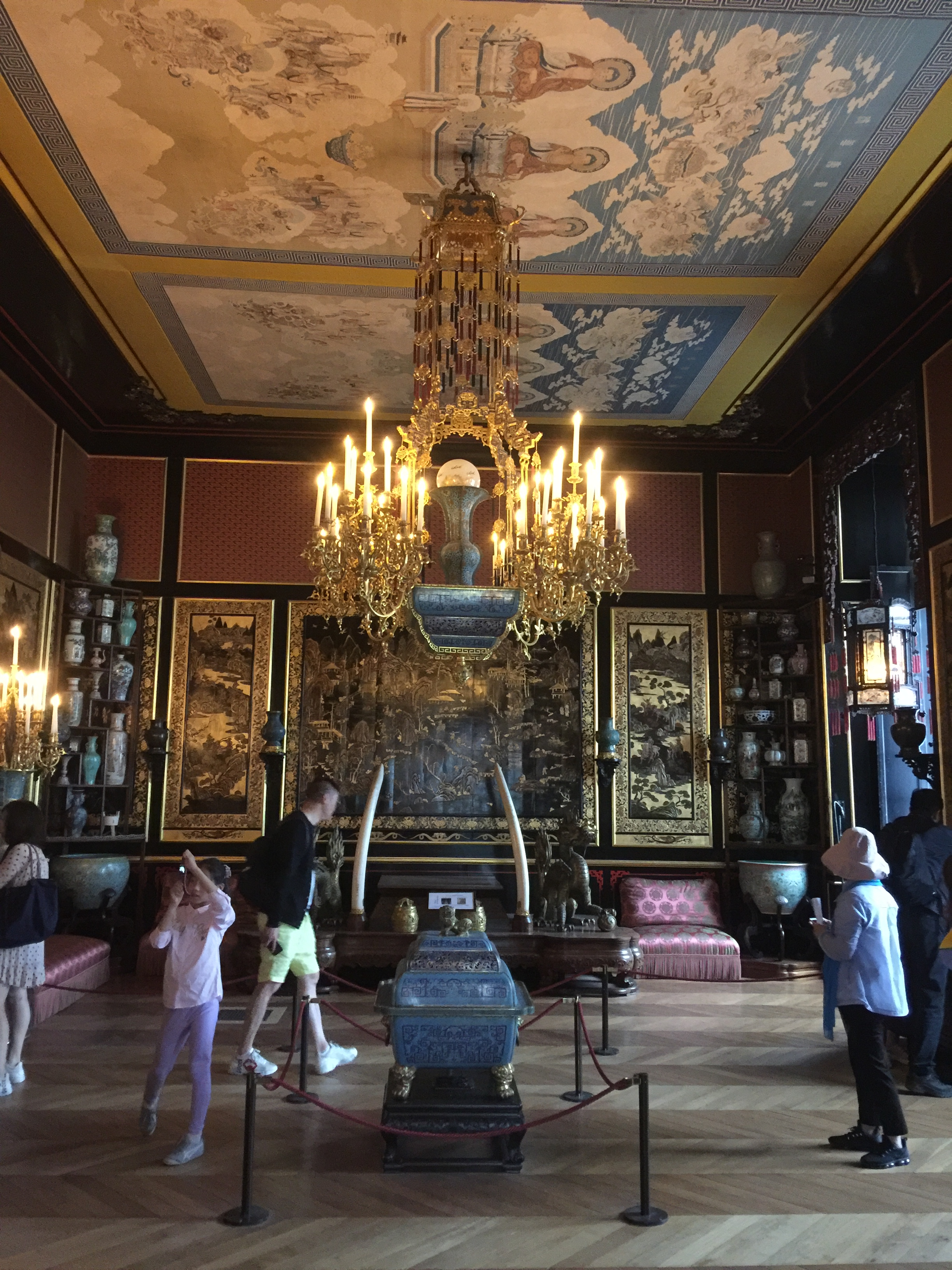
The Chinese Museum created by the Empress Eugenie (1867)

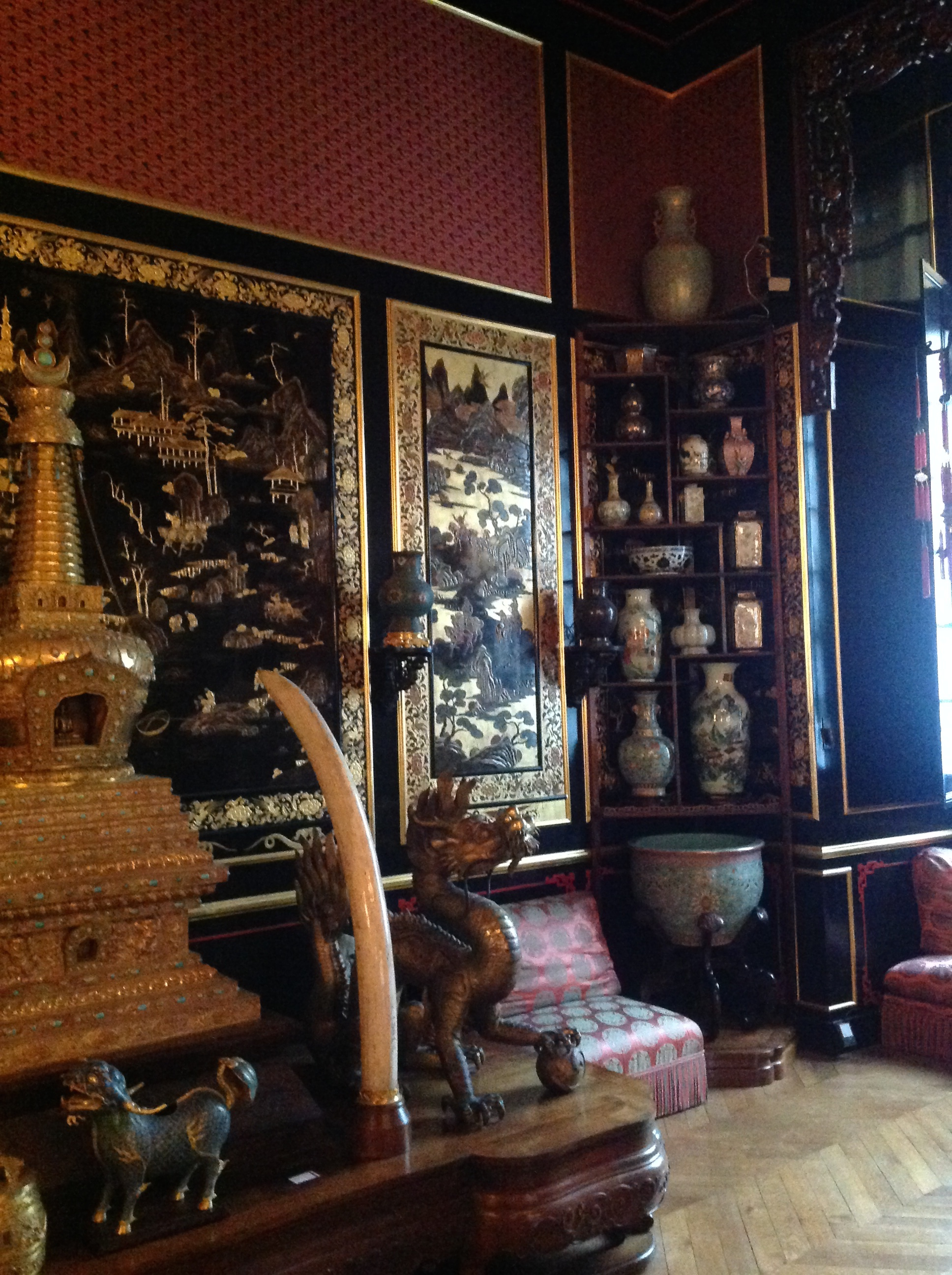
Panels and vases in the Chinese Museum

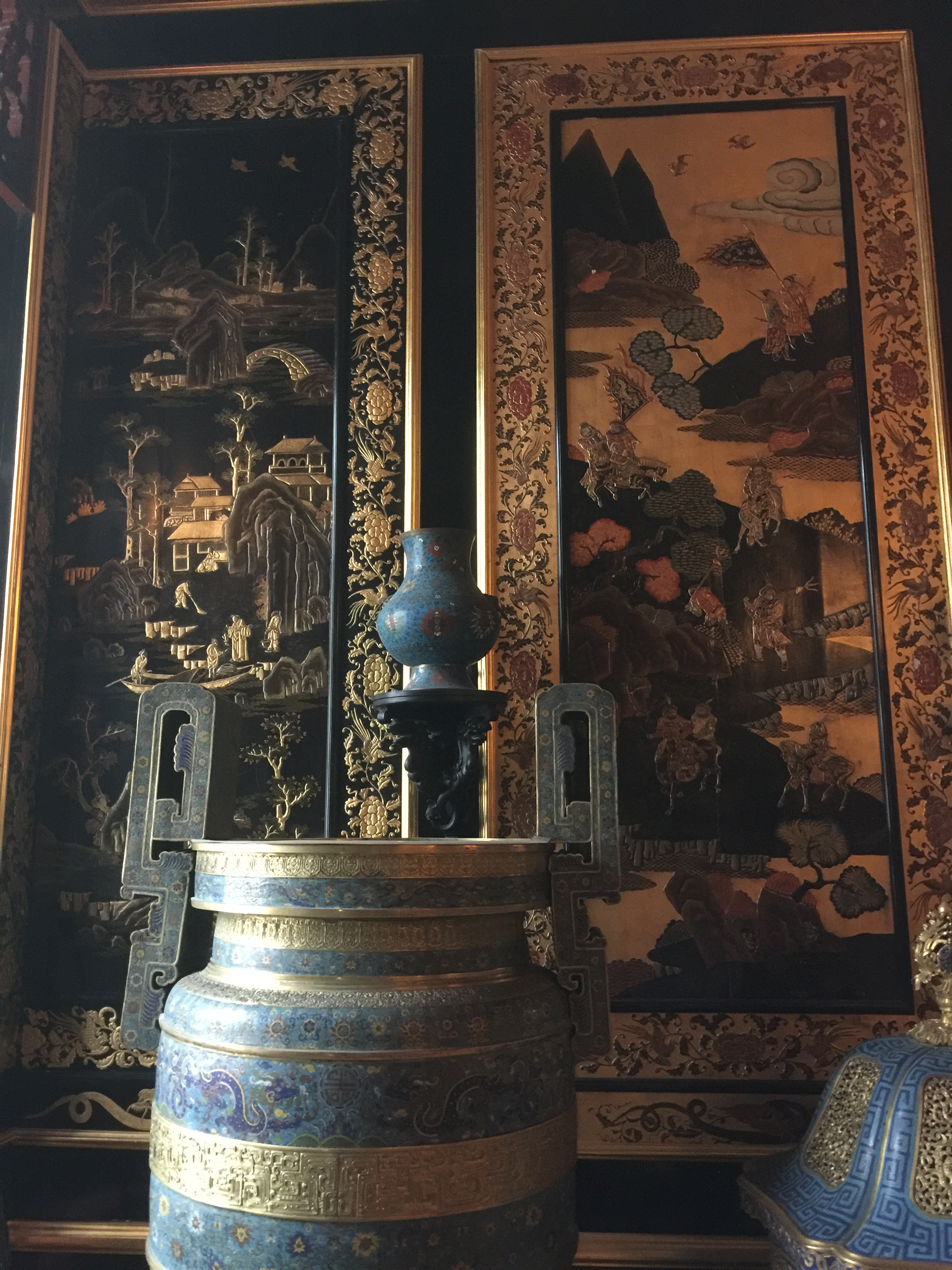
Panel and vase from the Qing dynasty

The Chinese Museum, on the ground floor of the Gros Pavillon close to the pond, was among the last rooms decorated within the château while it was still an imperial residence. In 1867, the Empress Eugénie had the rooms remade to display her personal collection of Asian art, which included gifts given to the Emperor by a delegation sent by the King of Siam in 1861, and other objects taken during the destruction and looting of the Old Summer Palace near Beijing by a joint British-French military expedition to China in 1860.

The objects displayed in the antechamber include two royal palanquins given by the King of Siam, one designed for a king and the other (with curtains) for a queen. Inside the two salons of the museum, some of the walls are covered with lacquered wood panels in black and gold, taken from 17th-century Chinese screens, along with specially designed cases to display antique porcelain vases. Other objects on display include a Tibetan stupa containing a Buddha taken from the Summer Palace in China; and a royal Siamese crown given to Napoleon III. The salons are lavishly decorated with both Asian and European furnishings and art objects, including silk-covered furnishings and Second Empire sculptures by Charles Cordier and Pierre Alexandre Schoenewerk. The room also served as a place for games and entertainment; an old bagatelle game and a mechanical piano from that period are on display.

In addition to the Chinese Museum, the Empress created a small office in 1868, the Salon of Lacquerware, which also decorated with lacquered panels and Asian art objects, on the ground floor of the Louis XV wing, not far from the office of the Emperor. This was the last room decorated before the fall of the Empire, and the eventual transformation of the château into a museum.

== Theatre ==
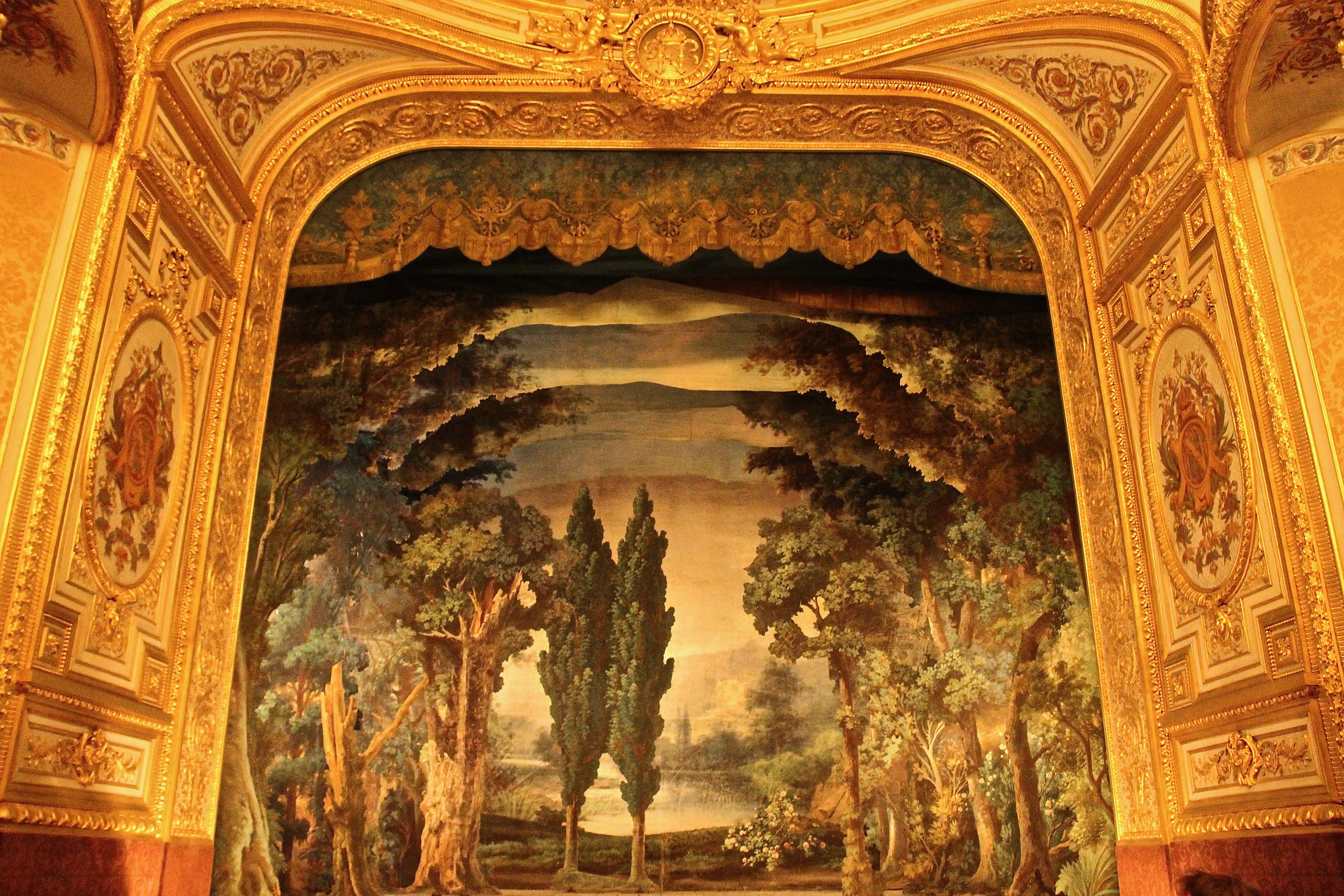
Theater stage (1854)

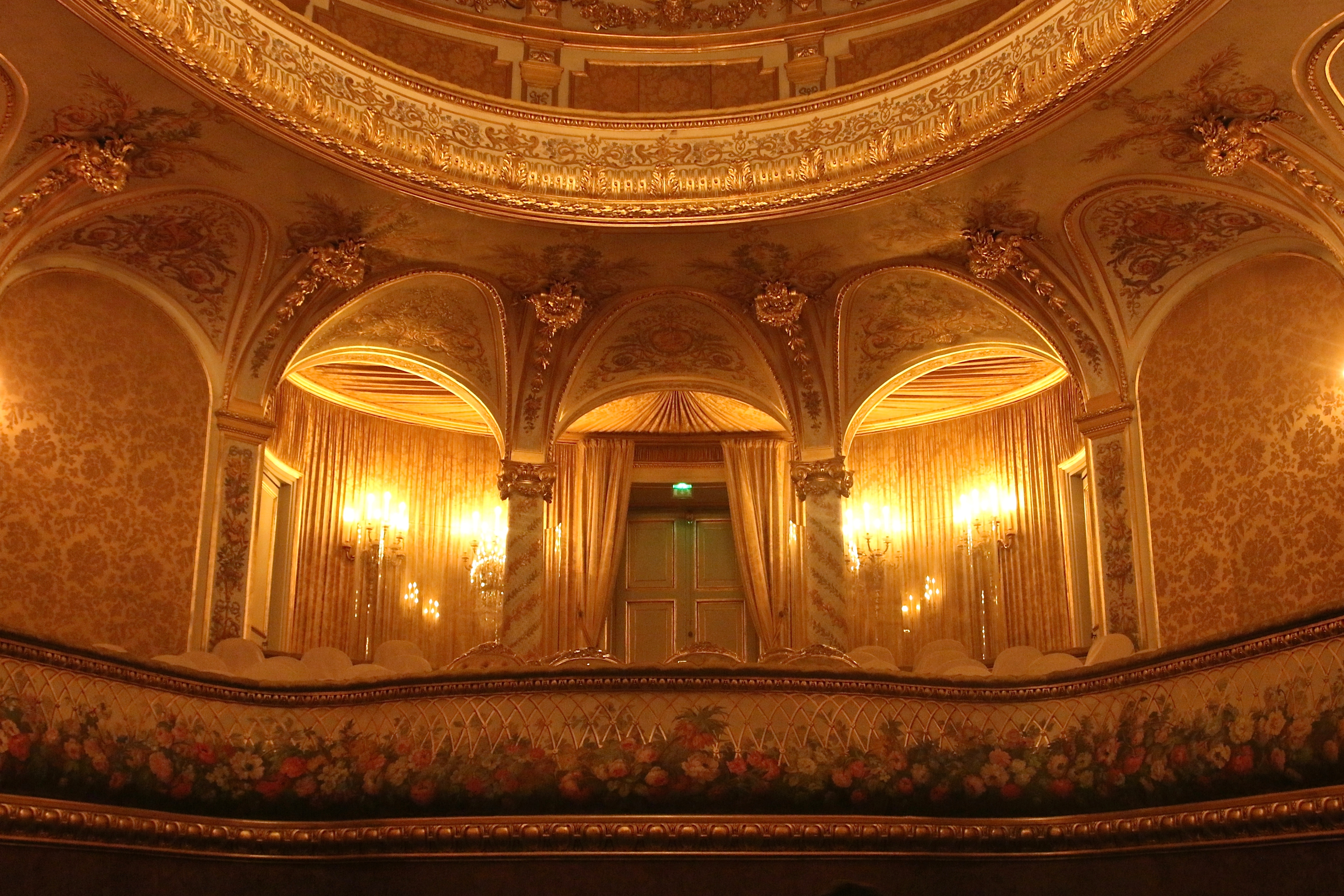
The Emperor's box

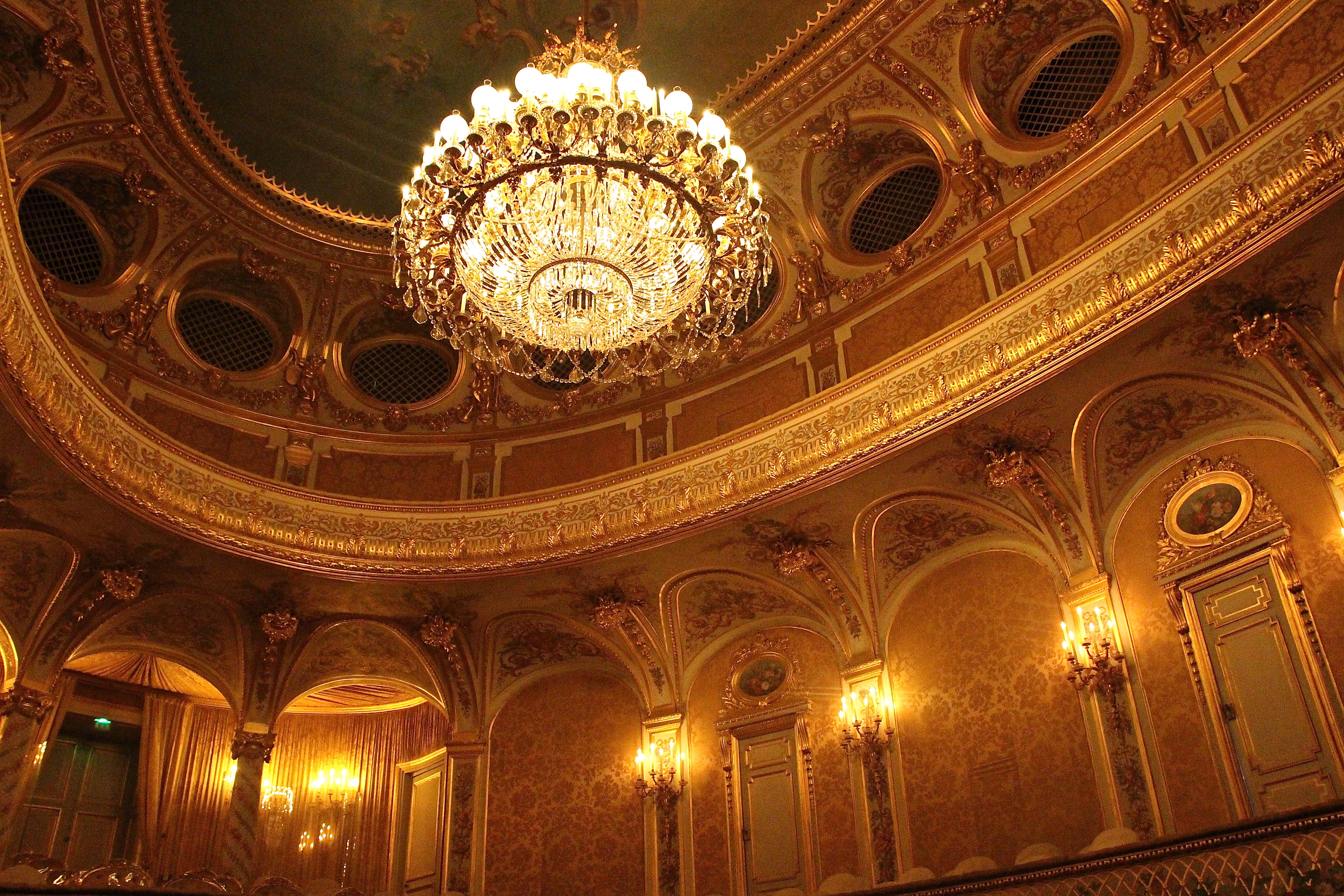
Chandelier of the theater

Concerts, plays and other theatrical productions were a regular part of court life at Fontainebleau. Prior to the reign of Louis XV these took place in different rooms of the palace, but during his reign a theatre was built in the Belle-Cheminée wing. It was rebuilt by the architect Gabriel, but was destroyed by a fire in 1856. It had already been judged too small for the court of Napoleon III, and a new theatre had been begun in 1854 at the far eastern end of the wing of Louis XIV. It was designed by architect Hector Lefuel in the Louis XVI style, and was inspired by the Royal Opera of Versailles and the Théâtre de la Reine at the Petit Trianon. The new theatre, with four hundred seats arranged in a parterre, two balconies and boxes in a horseshoe shape, was finished in 1856. It has the original stage machinery, and many of the original sets, including many transferred from the old theatre before the fire of 1856.

The theatre was closed after the end of the Second Empire and was rarely used. A restoration began in 2007, funded with ten million Euros by the government of Abu Dhabi. In exchange, the theatre was renamed for Sheikh Khalifa bin Zayed Al Nahyan. It was inaugurated on 30 April 2014. The theatre can be visited, but it no longer can be used for plays because some working parts of the theater, including the stage, were not included in the restoration. As of April 2024.

== Park and gardens ==
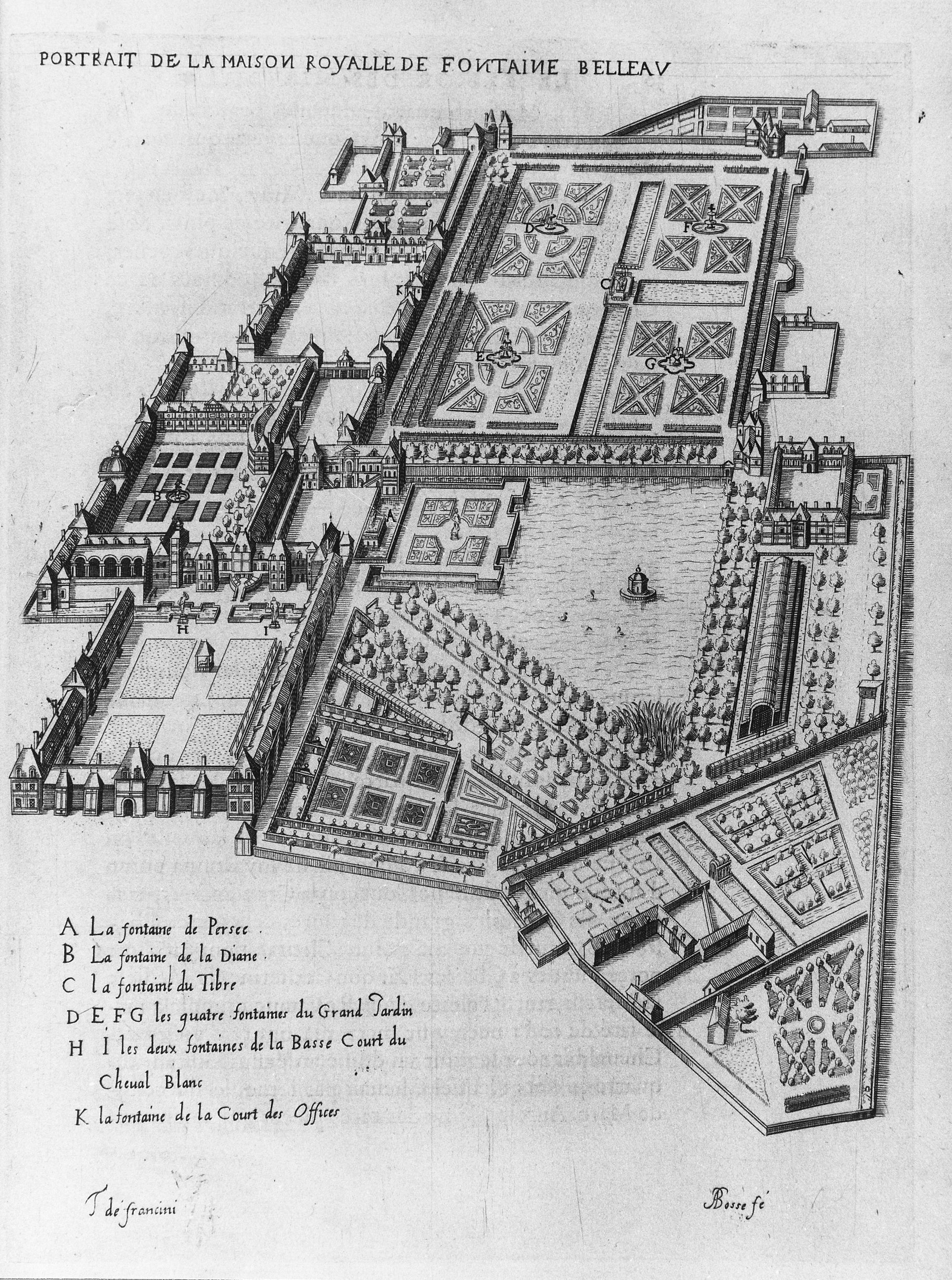
Château and gardens in about 1650

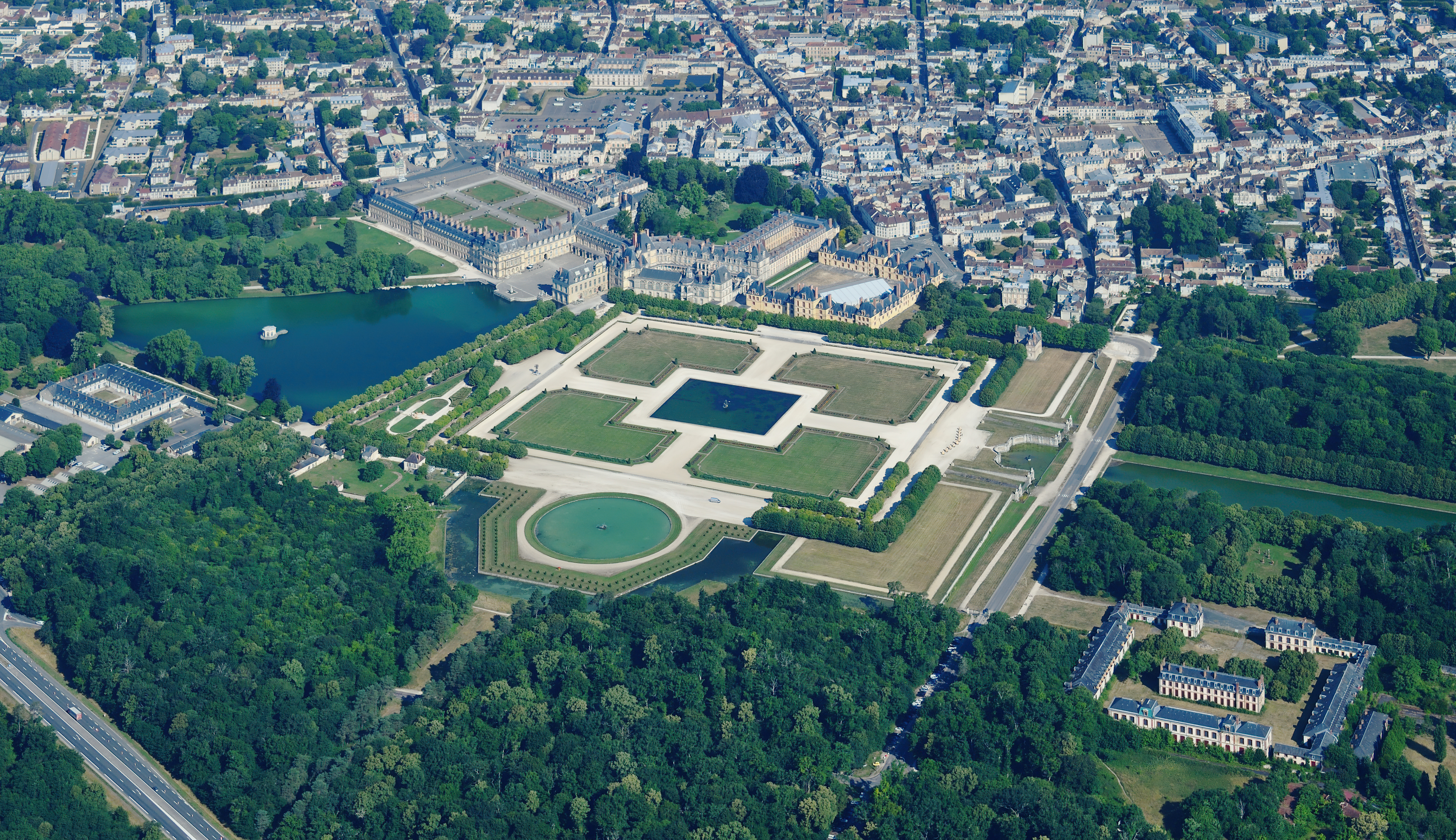
Aerial view of the palace and its park

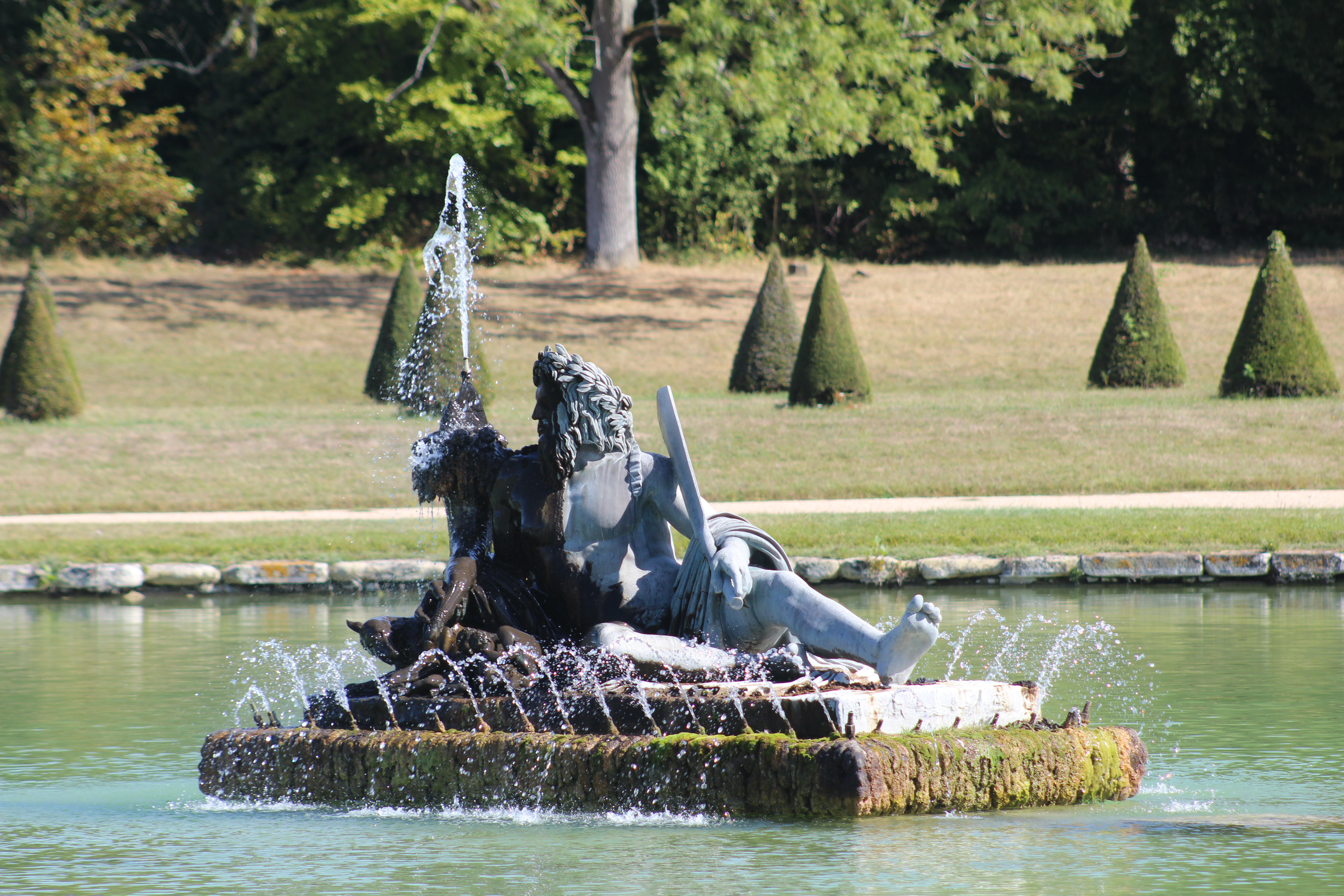
Statue of the Tiber in the round basin, a copy of an ancient Roman statue now in the Louvre

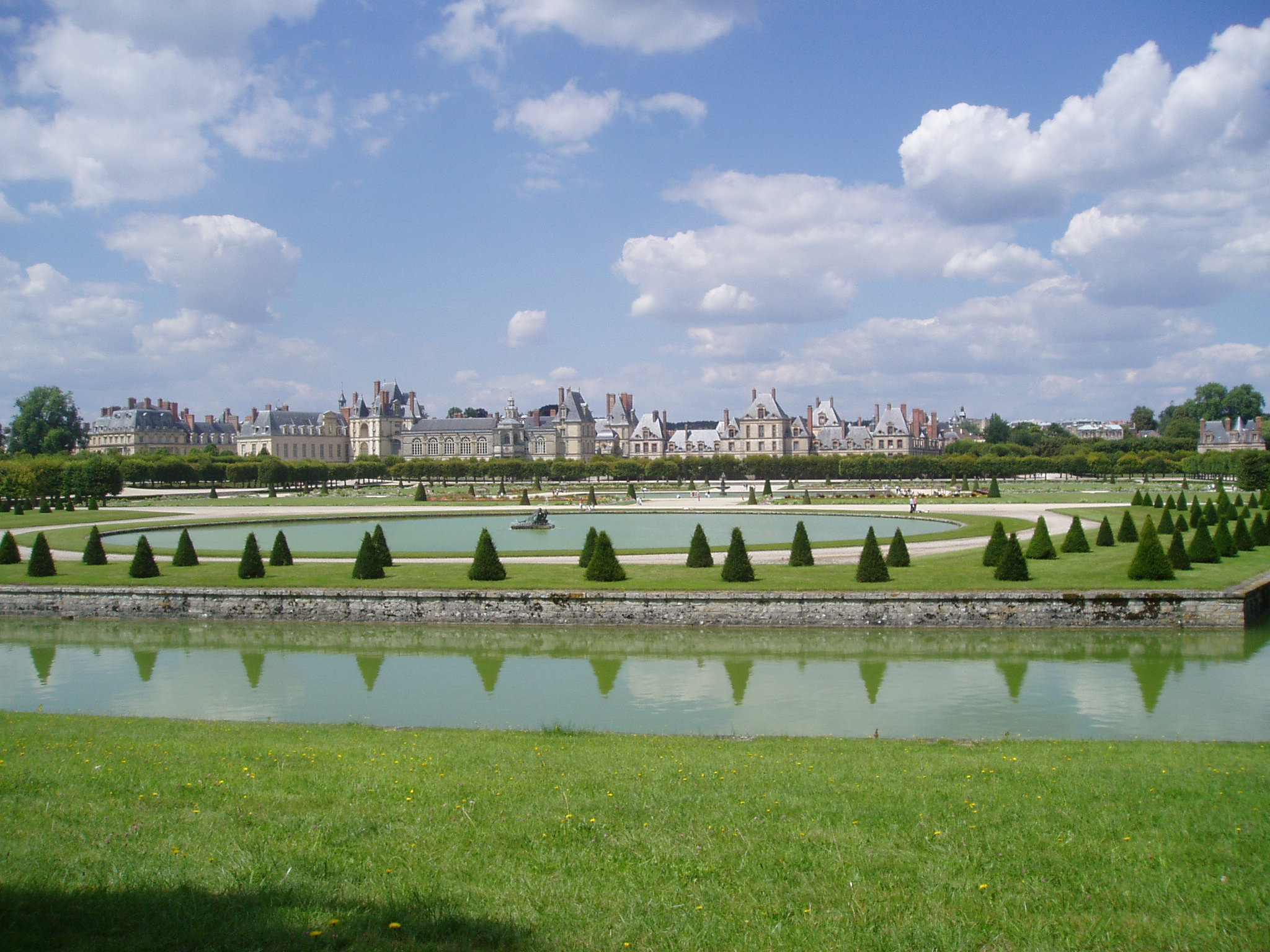
The canal, round basin, parterre and behind, the château

The gardens of Fontainebleau illustrate three centuries of French landscape gardening. When Francis I began building the château, he surrounded it with formal gardens. In the 16th century Catherine de' Medici created a French Renaissance garden, inspired by the Italian Renaissance garden, filled with statuary. Henry IV greatly expanded the gardens. Between 1606 and 1609, Henry built a grand canal that extended for 1200 meters in length, similar to one at the nearby château of Fleury-en-Bière. Louis XIV commissioned André Le Nôtre to create a distinctly classical French formal garden at the end of the 18th century. During the First Empire of Napoleon I, the royal landscape architect, Maximilien Joseph Hurtault, created an English landscape garden with winding paths and picturesque groves of trees.

On the other side of the château, on the site of the garden of Francis I, Henry IV created a large formal garden, or parterre. Between 1660 and 1664 the chief gardener of Louis XIV, André Le Nôtre, and Louis Le Vau rebuilt the parterre on a grander scale, filling it with geometric designs and paths bordered with boxwood hedges and filled with colorful flowerbeds. They also added a basin called Les Cascades, surrounded by waterfalls, at the head of the canal. Le Nôtre planted shade trees along the length of the canal, and also laid out a wide path, lined with elm trees, parallel to the canal.

The fountains of Louis XIV were removed after his reign. In the 19th century the cascades were decorated with works of classical sculpture. A large ornamental fountain was installed in the central basin in 1817. A bronze replica of an ancient Roman statue, "The Tiber", was placed in the round basin in 1988. It replaced an earlier statue from the 16th century which earlier had decorated the basin. Two statues of sphinxes by Mathieu Lespagnandel, from 1664, are placed near the balustrade of the grand canal.

=== Garden of Diana ===
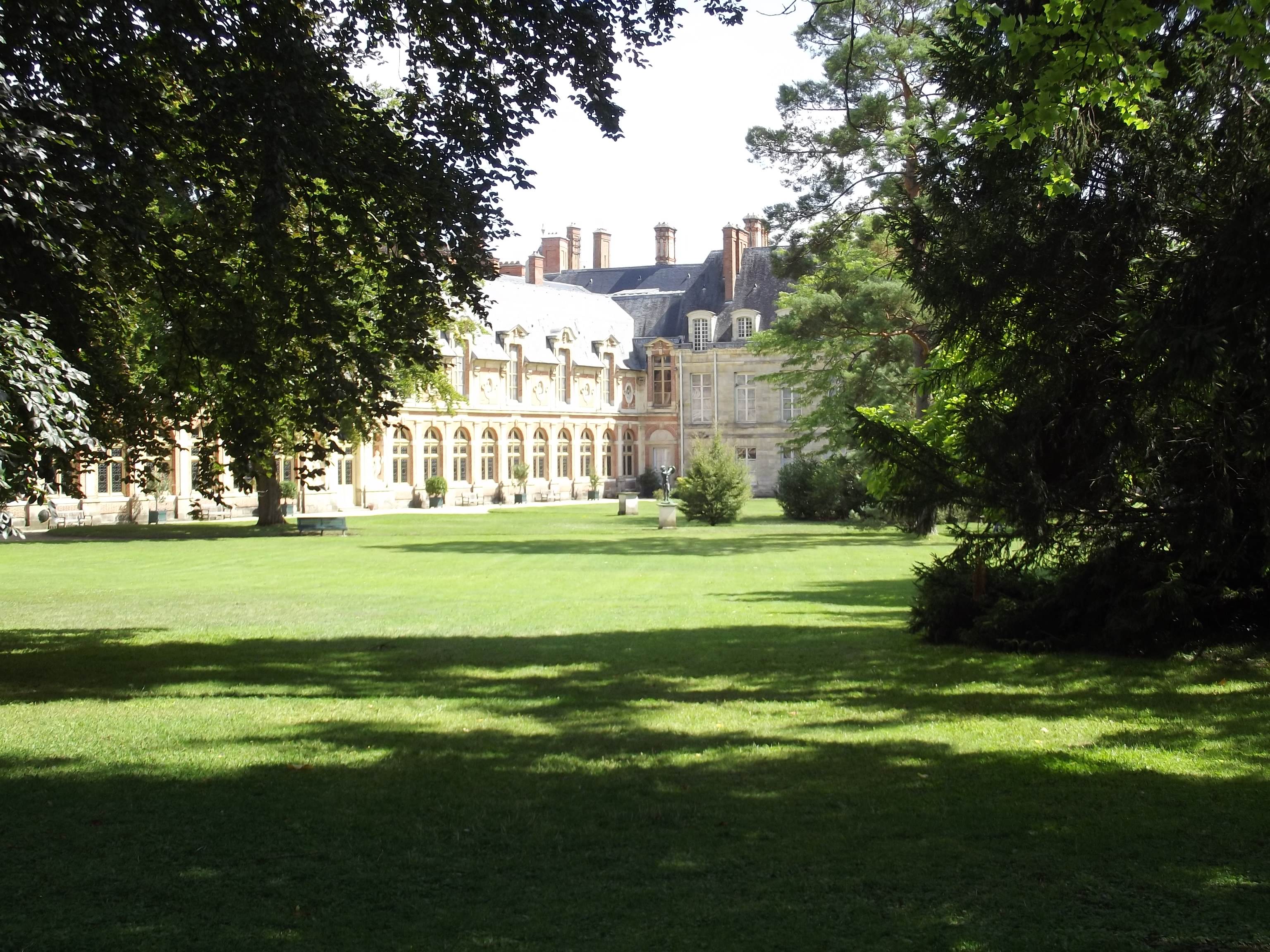
Garden of Diana, in front of the King's apartments

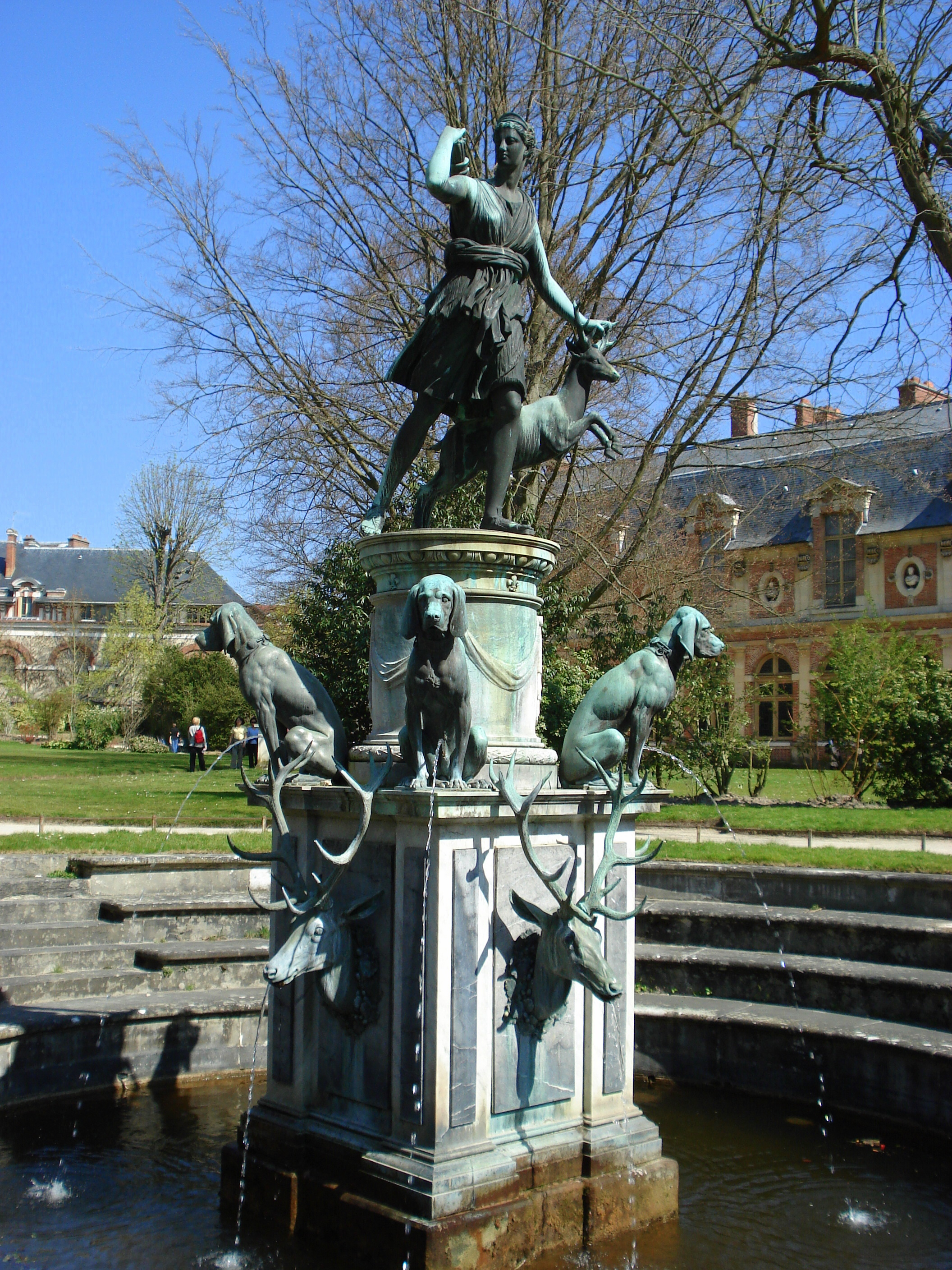
Fountain of Diana (17th century)

The Garden of Diana, the goddess of the hunt, was created during the reign of Henry IV; it was the private garden of the King and Queen, and was visible from the windows of their rooms. The fountain of Diana was originally in the center of garden, which at that time was enclosed by another wing, containing offices and later, under, Louis XIV, an orangerie. That building, and another, the former chancellery, were demolished in the 19th century, doubling the size of the garden.

From the 17th until the end of the 18th century, the garden was in the Italian and then the French formal style, divided by straight paths into rectangular flower beds, centered on the fountains and decorated with statues, ornamental plants and citrus trees in pots. It was transformed during the reign of Napoleon I into a landscape garden in the English style, with winding paths and trees grouped into picturesque landscapes, and it was enlarged during the reign of Louis-Philippe. It was opened to the public during the Third Republic.

The fountain in the center was made by Tommaso Francini, the master Italian fountain-maker, whose work included the Medici Fountain in the Jardin du Luxembourg in Paris. The bronze statue of Diana, the goddess of the hunt, with a young deer, was made by the Keller brothers in 1684 for another royal residence, at Marly. It is a copy of an antique Roman statue, Diana of Versailles, which was given by Pope Paul IV to King Henry IV, and which is now in the Louvre. The original statue of the fountain, made by Barthelemy Prieur in 1602, can be seen in the Gallery of the Deer inside the palace. The sculptures of hunting dogs and deer around the fountain were made by Pierre Biard l'Aîné.

=== Carp pond and the pavilion ===
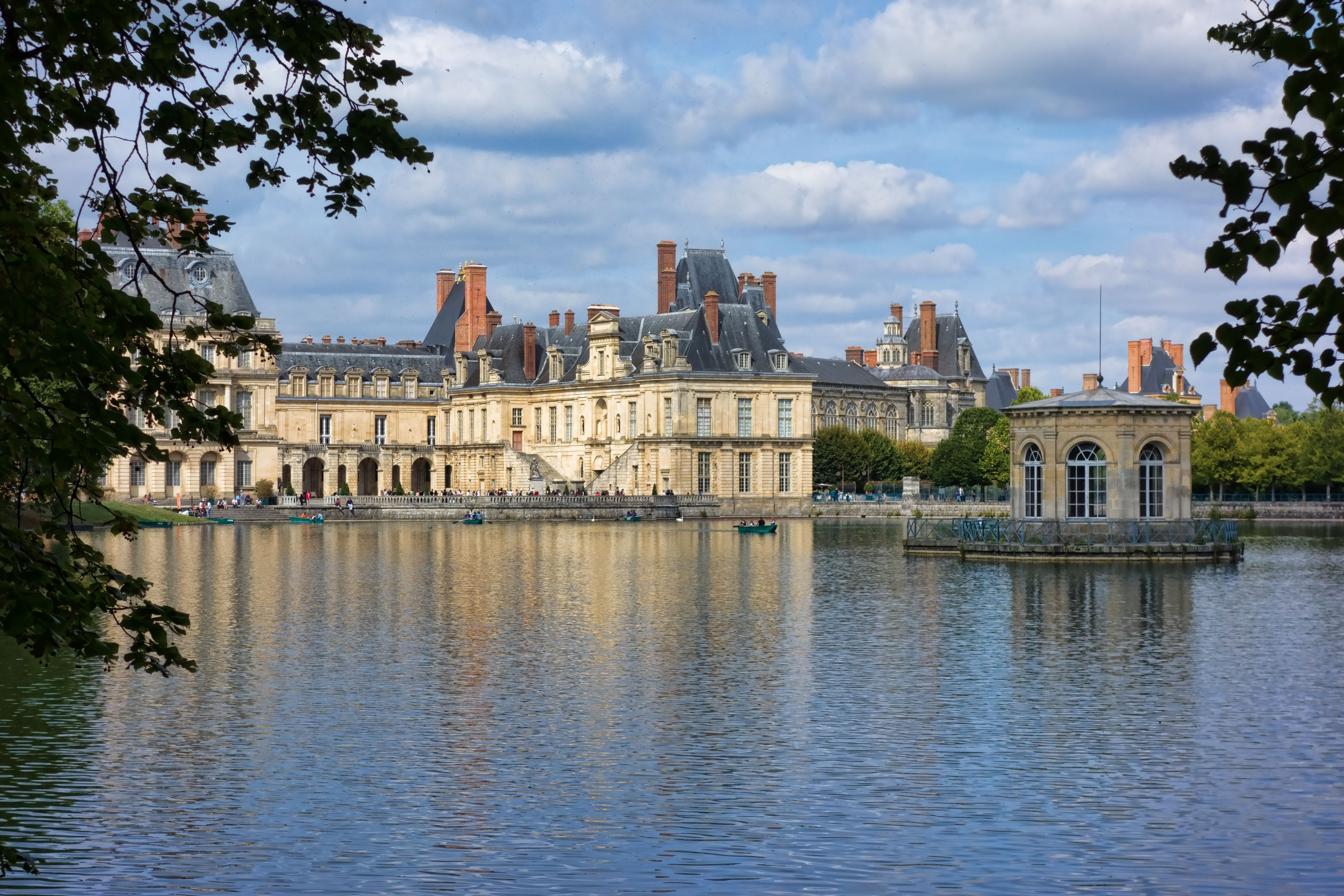
Fountain Court and the carp pond

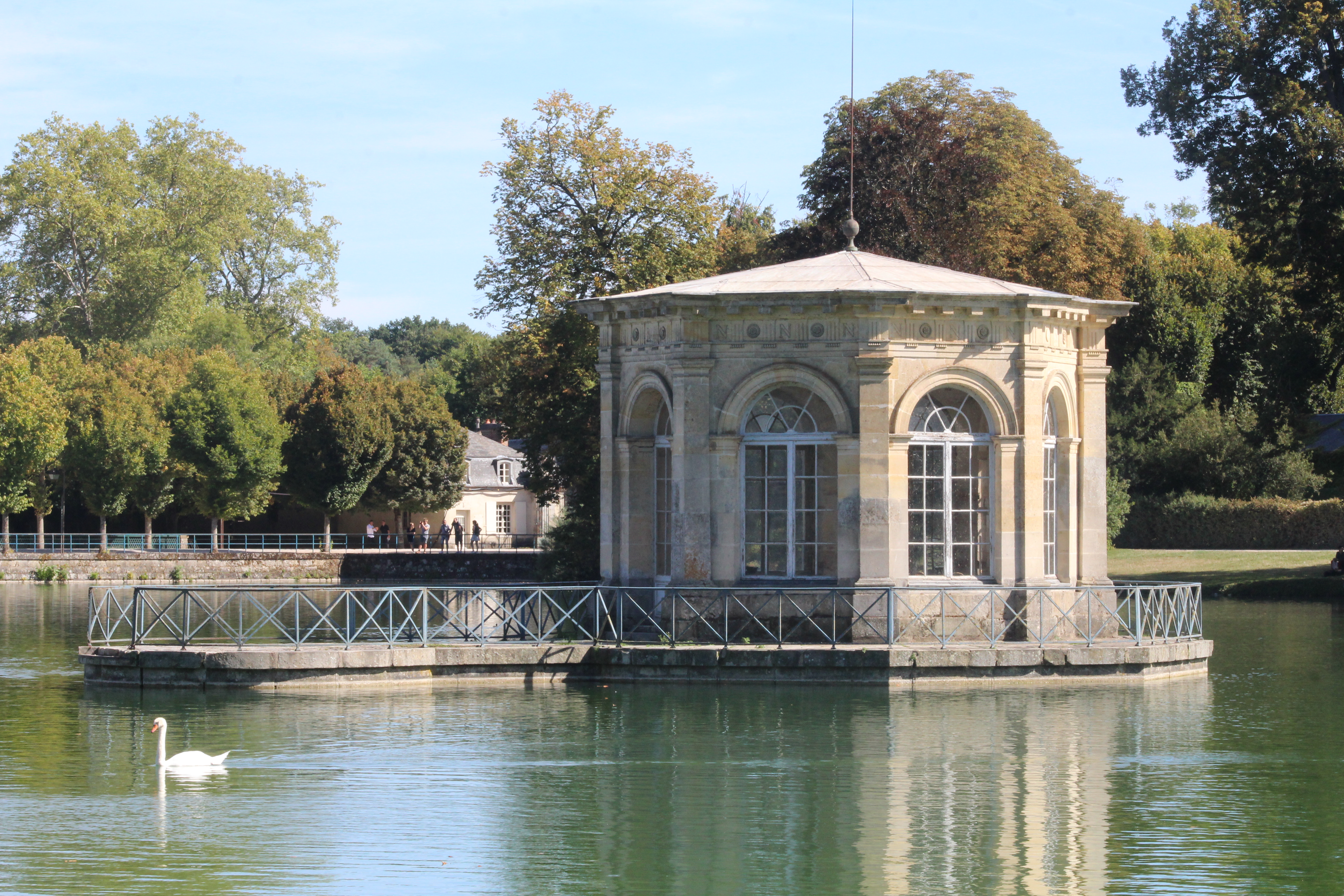
The pavilion, first built by Louis XIV, then modified by Napoleon

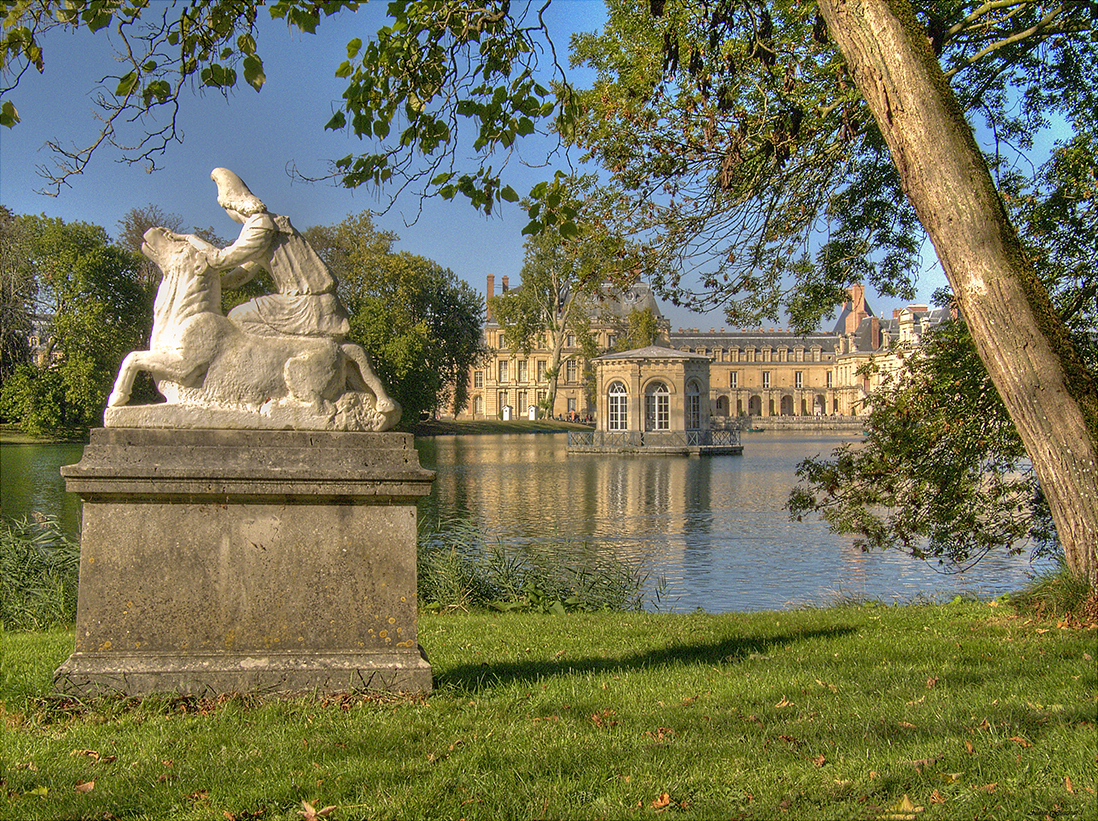
Carp Pond facing the château

The large pond next to the palace, with a surface of four hectares, was first stocked with carp during the reign of Henry IV, and was used for boating parties by members of the Court, and as a source of fish for the table and for amusement. Descriptions of the palace in the 17th century tell of guests feeding the carp, some of which reached enormous size, and were said to be a hundred years old. The small octagonal house on an island in the center of the lake, Pavillon de l'Ètang, was added during the reign of Louis XIV, then rebuilt under Napoleon I, and is decorated with his initial.

=== English garden ===
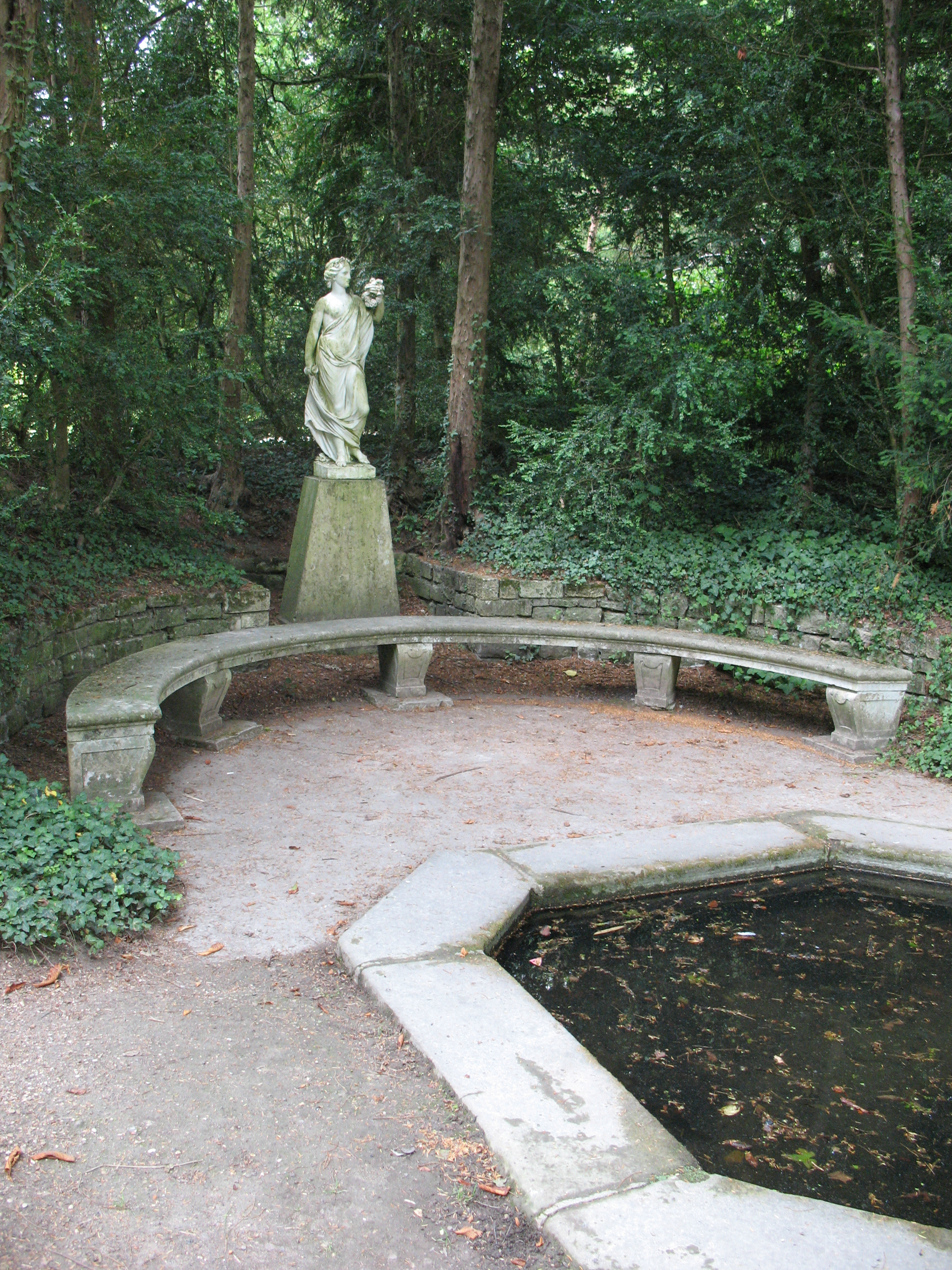
Statue of a Naiad facing the Belle-Eau fountain.

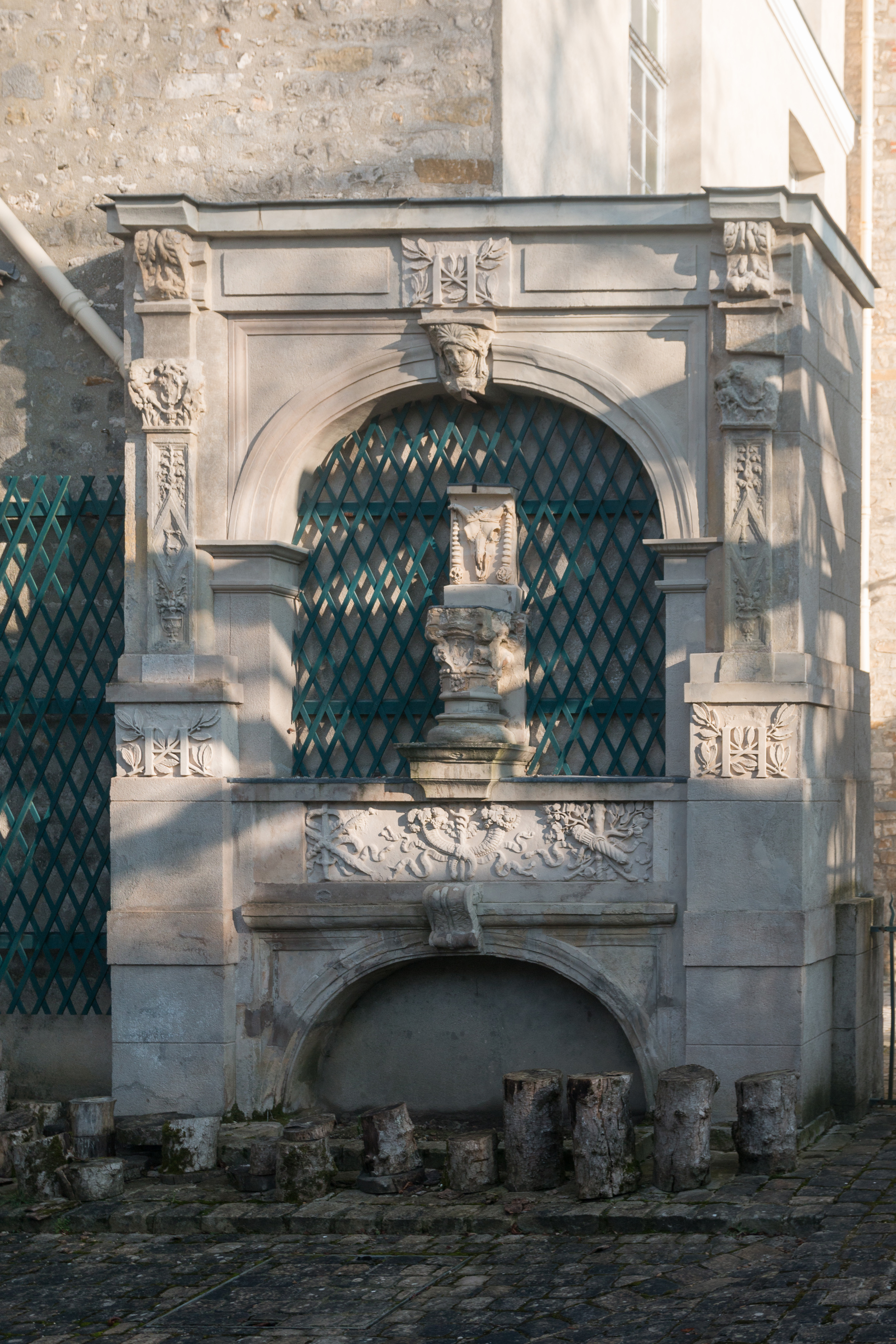
Fountain and grotto of the pine garden of Francis I (16th c.)

The garden was originally created by Francis I as the Pine Garden. At the far corner of the English garden close to the palace is the only remaining element of the original gardens of Francis I; the first Renaissance-style grotto to be built in a French garden, decorated with four statues of Atlas.

Under Napoleon's landscape architect, Maximilien Joseph Hurtault, this part of the garden was developed into an English park, with winding paths and exotic trees, including planting of catalpa, tulip trees, sophora and cypress trees from Louisiana, and introduction of a picturesque stream and antique boulders. The garden features two 17th-century bronze copies of ancient Roman originals, the Borghese Gladiator and the Dying Gaul.

A path leads from the garden through a curtain of trees to the Belle-Eau Fountain or "Fontaine Belle-Eau" ("Spring of beautiful water"), a natural spring which in the 17th century gave its name to the palace and gardens. The fountain was rebuilt with an octagonal basin in 1891 and a classical statue of Hera, or the "Naiad of Belle-Eau, was added close by. In the 1980s, to bring more contemporary art into the gardens, a group of statues of mythical figures entirely unrelated to the château's history was placed close around the fountain.

== Art and decoration – the School of Fontainebleau ==
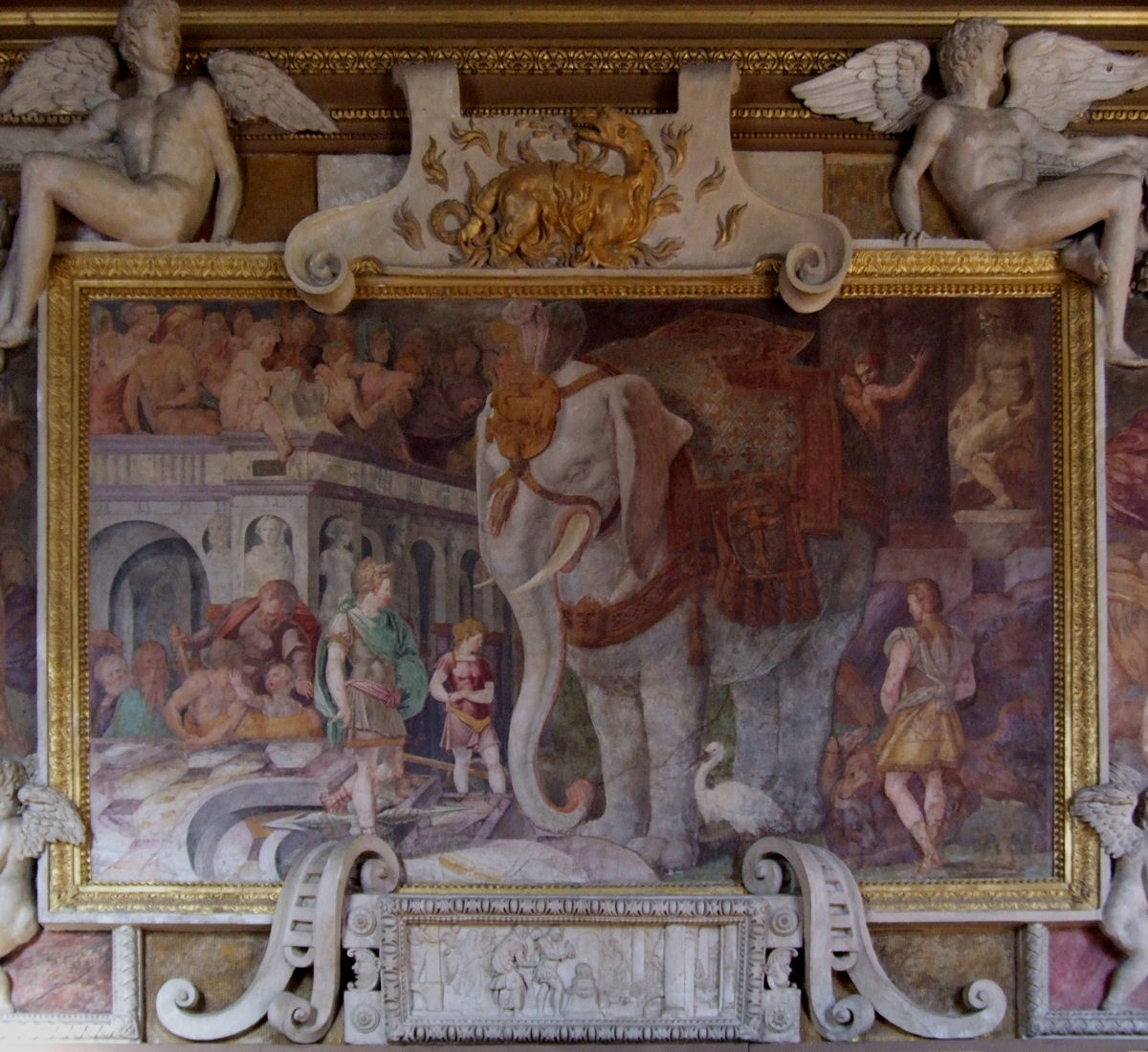
Painting by Rosso Fiorentino in the Gallery of Francis I (1533–1539)

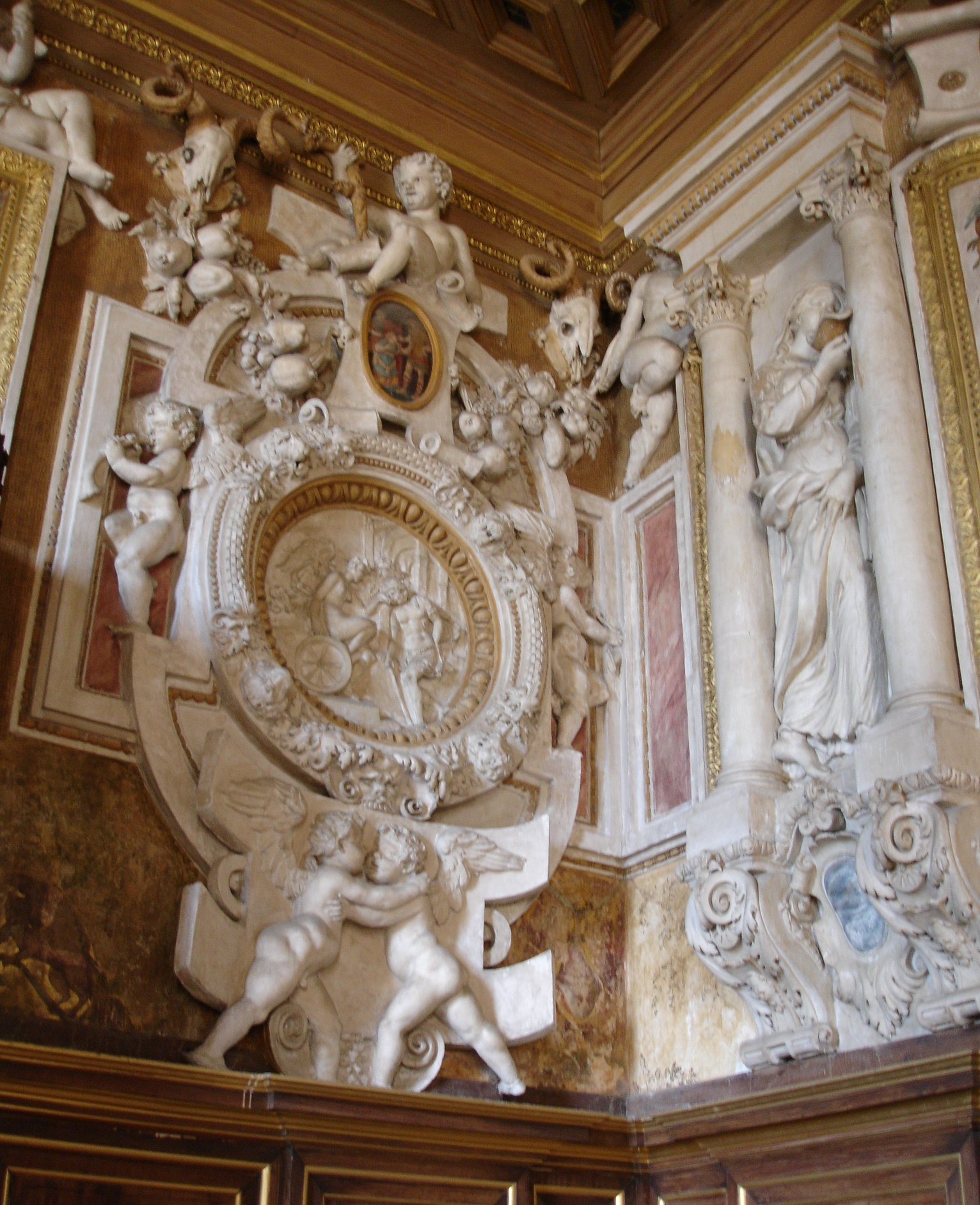
Detail of stucco and woodwork in the Gallery of Francis I, by Francesco Scibec da Carpi (died c.1557)

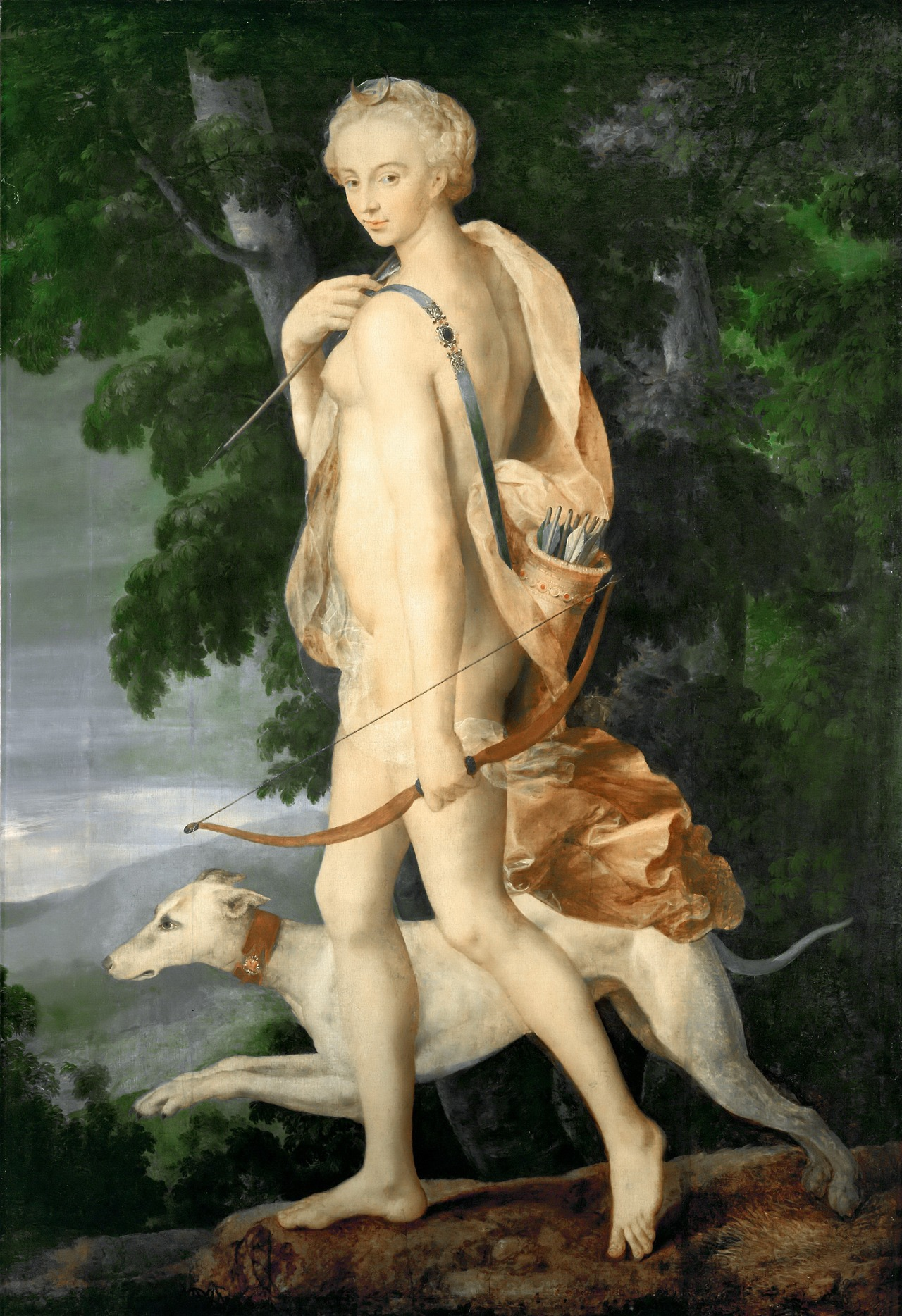
Diana the Huntress, School of Fontainebleau (1550–1560)

During the late French Renaissance, the decoration of the Palace of Fontainebleau engaged some of the finest artists and craftsmen from Italy and France. The style of painting and decoration they created became known as the School of Fontainebleau, and covered a period from about 1530 until about 1610. It helped form the French version of Northern Mannerism.

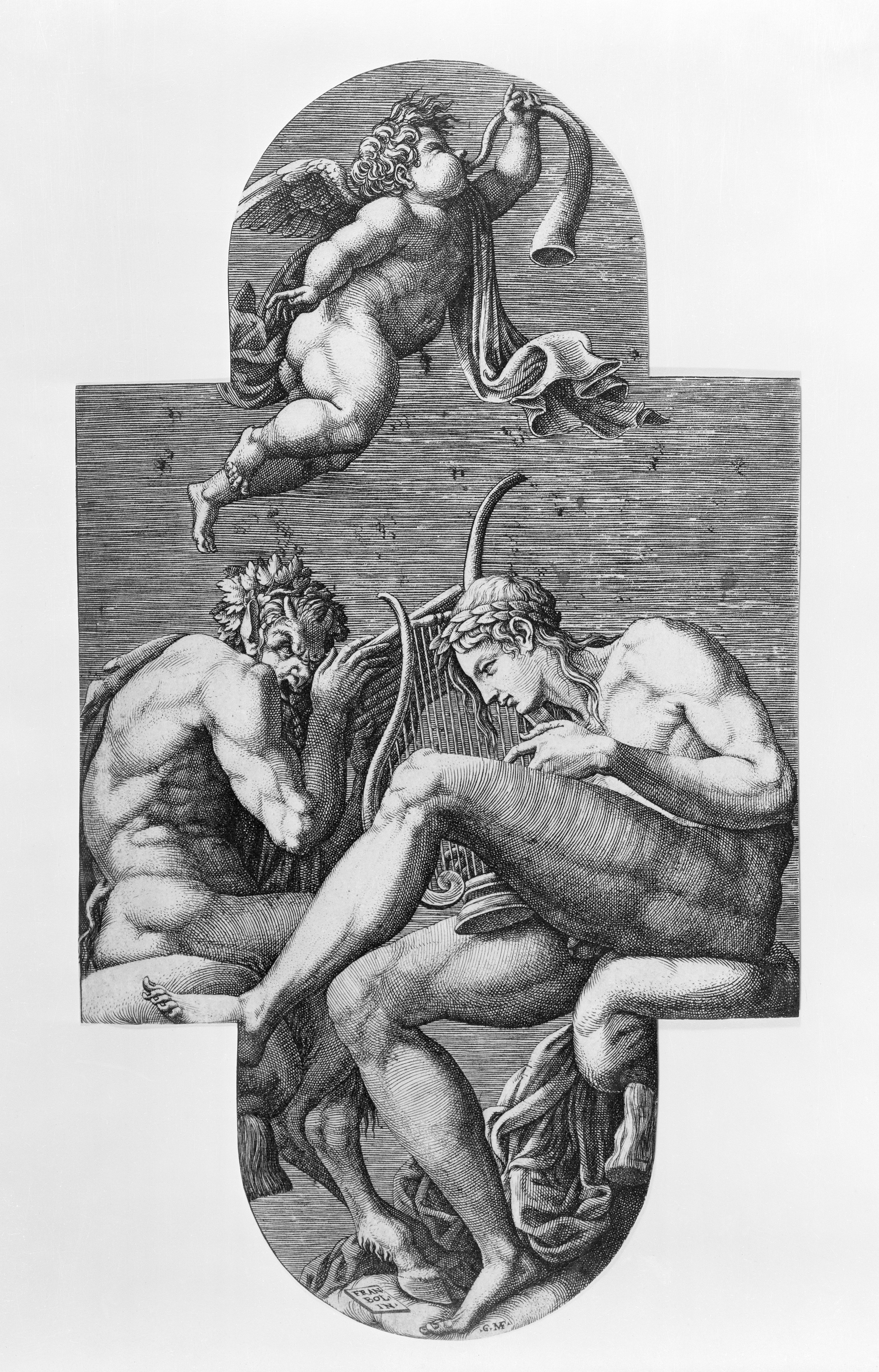
Apollo, Pan, and a putto blowing a horn, from a series of eight compositions after Francesco Primaticcio's designs for the ceiling of the Ulysses Gallery (destroyed 1738–39).

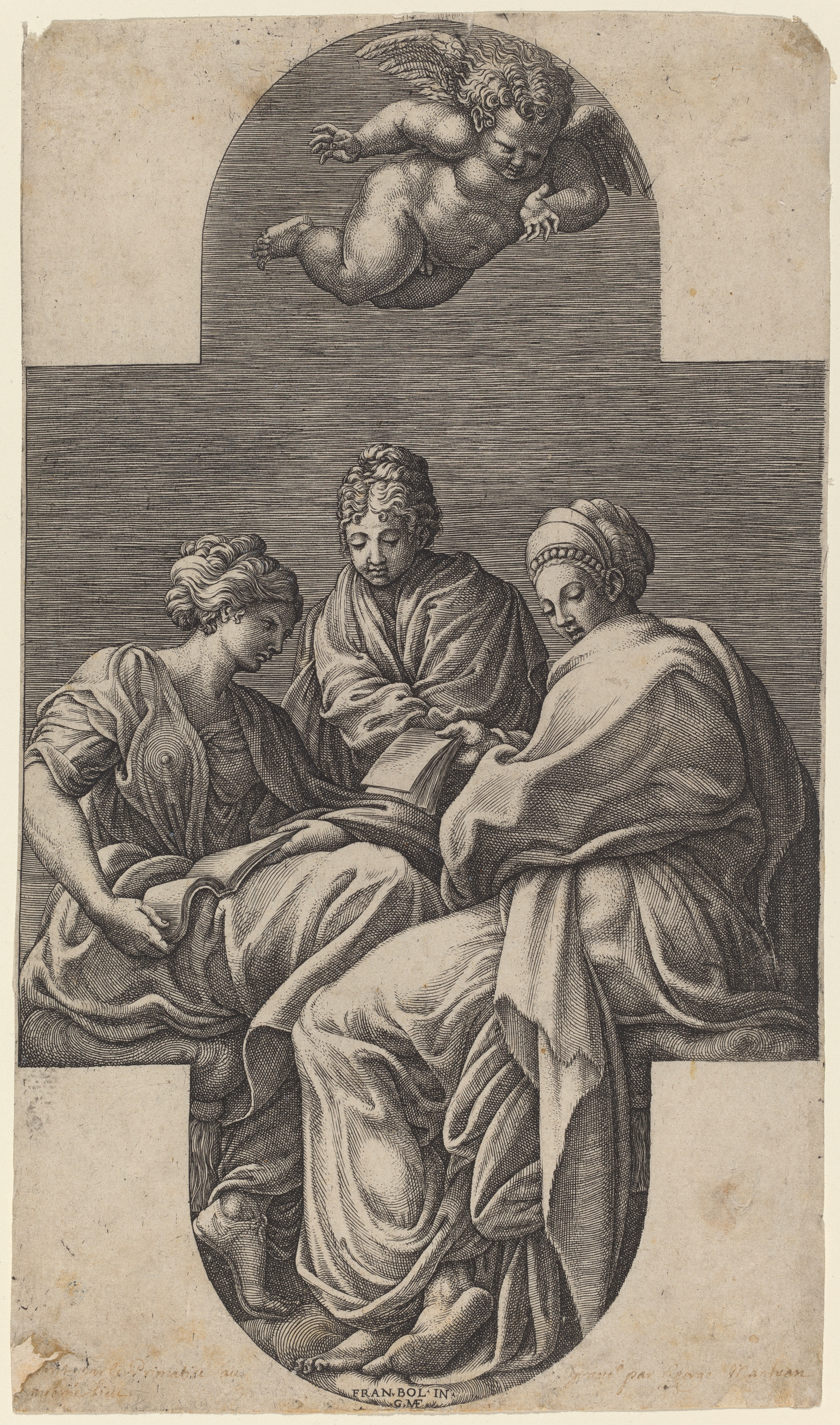
Giorgio Ghisi after Francesco Primaticcio, Three Muses and a Gesturing Putto, 1560s

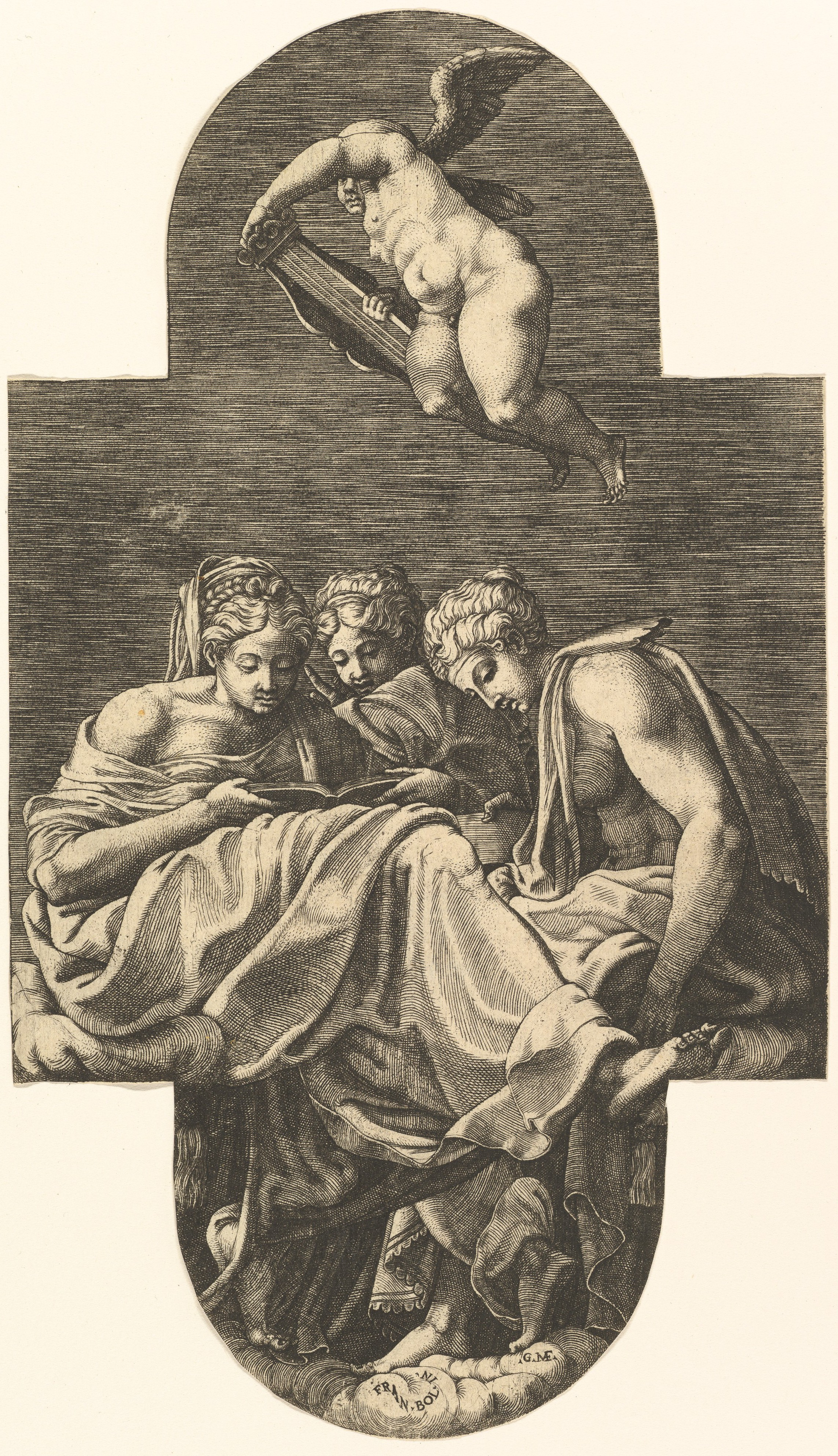
Three Muses and a putto above with a lyre, from a series of eight compositions after Francesco Primaticcio's designs for the ceiling of the Ulysses Gallery (destroyed 1738–39) at Fontainebleau MET

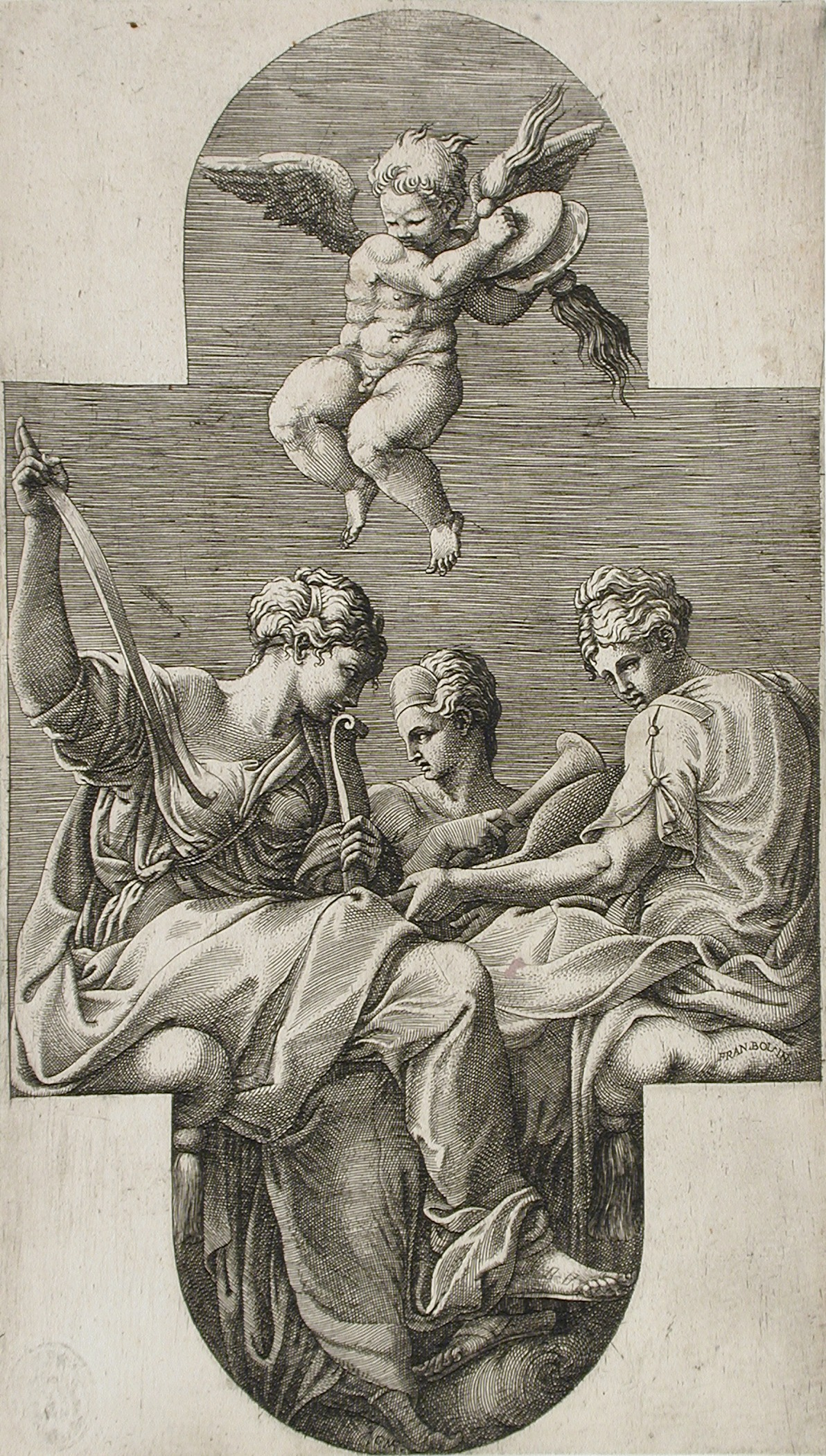
Three Muses and a Putto with a Cymbals

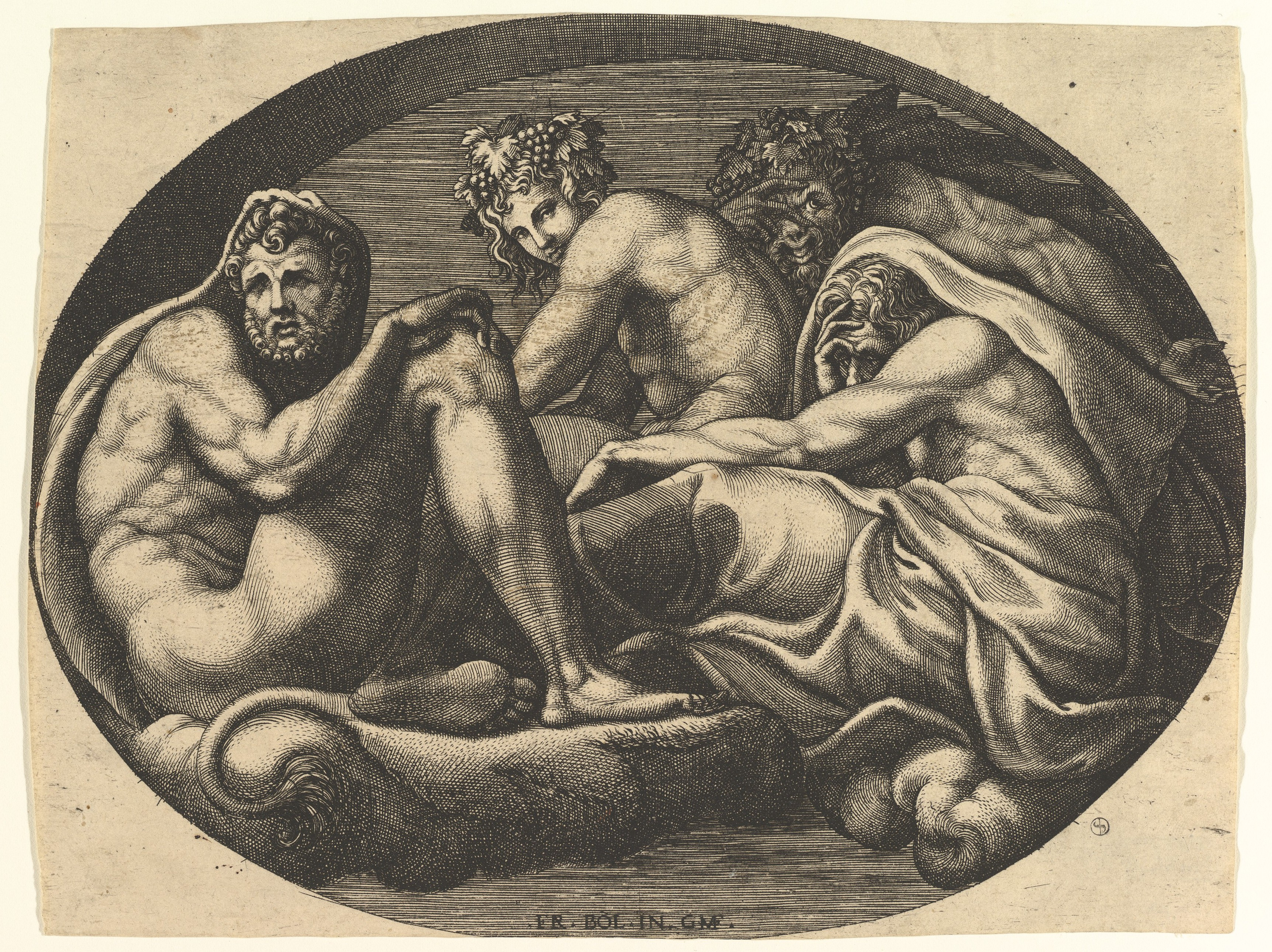
Hercules, Bacchus, Pan, and Saturn(?), from a series of eight compositions after Francesco Primaticcio's designs for the ceiling of the Ulysses Gallery (destroyed 1738–39) at Fontainebleau

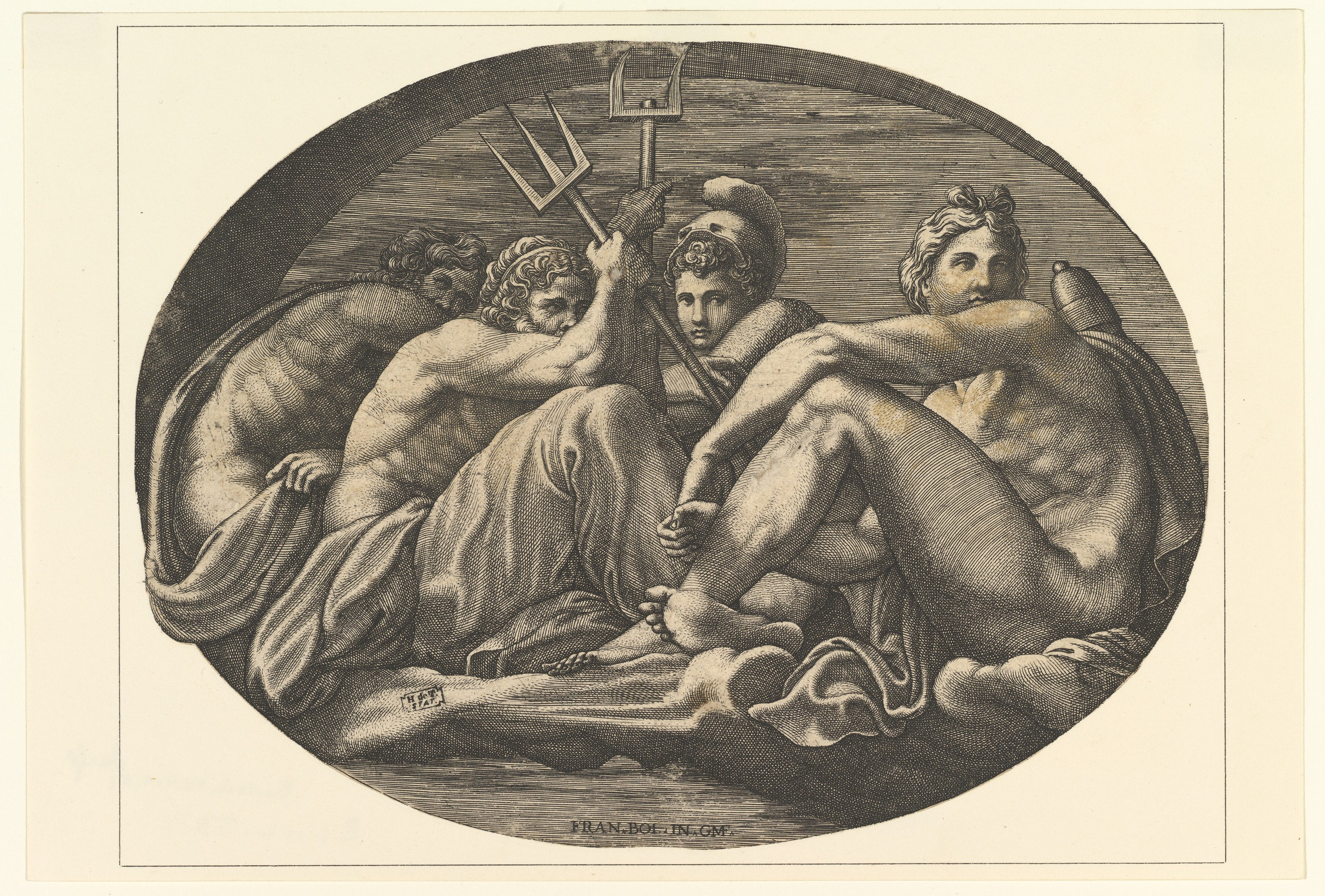
Pluto, Neptune, Minerva, and Apollo, from a series of eight compositions after Francesco Primaticcio's designs for the ceiling of the Ulysses Gallery (destroyed 1738–39) at Fontainebleau MET DP821340

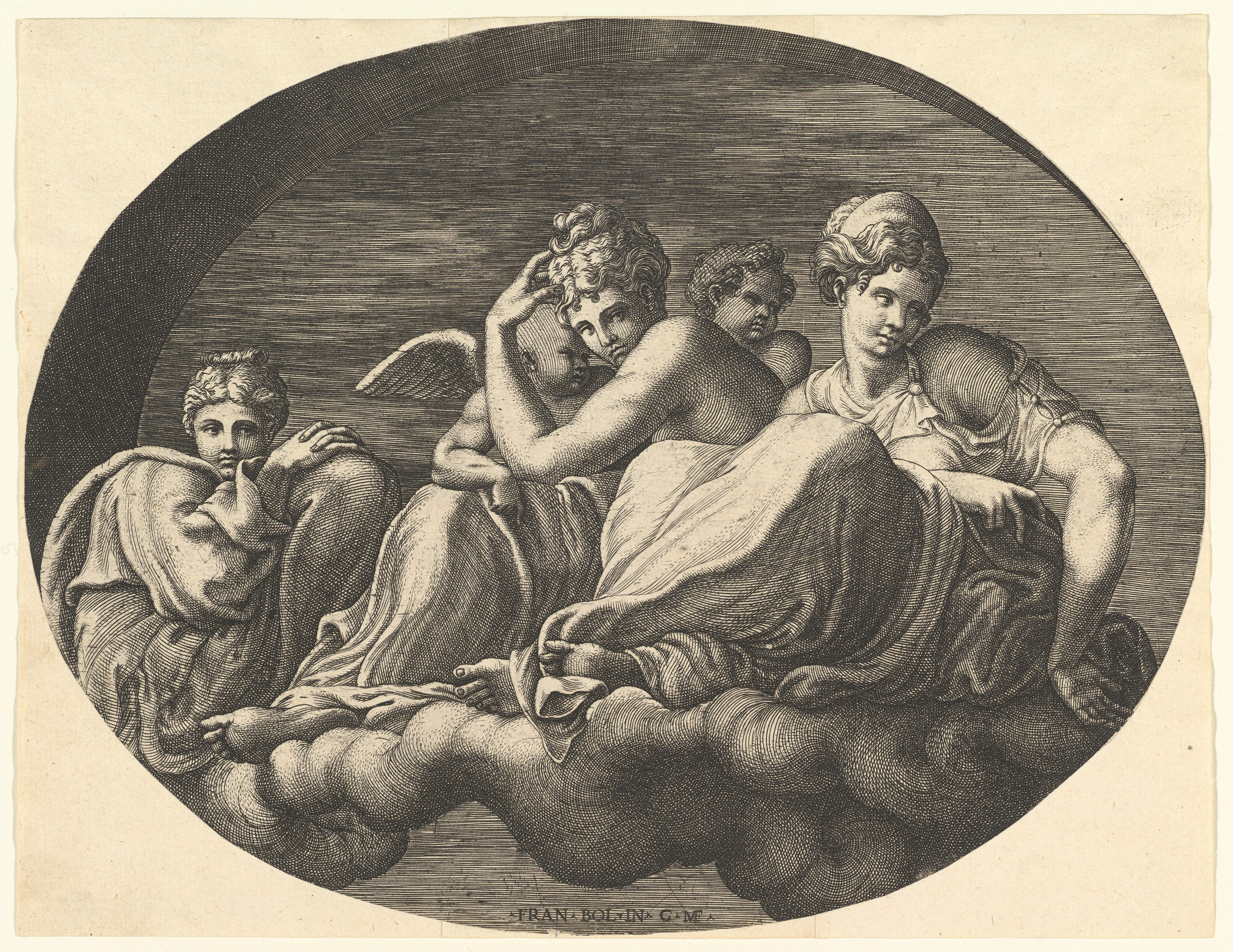
Venus and Cupid, two other goddesses and a putto, from a series of eight compositions after Francesco Primaticcio's designs for the ceiling of the Ulysses Gallery (destroyed 1738–39) at Fontainebleau MET DP821341.jpg

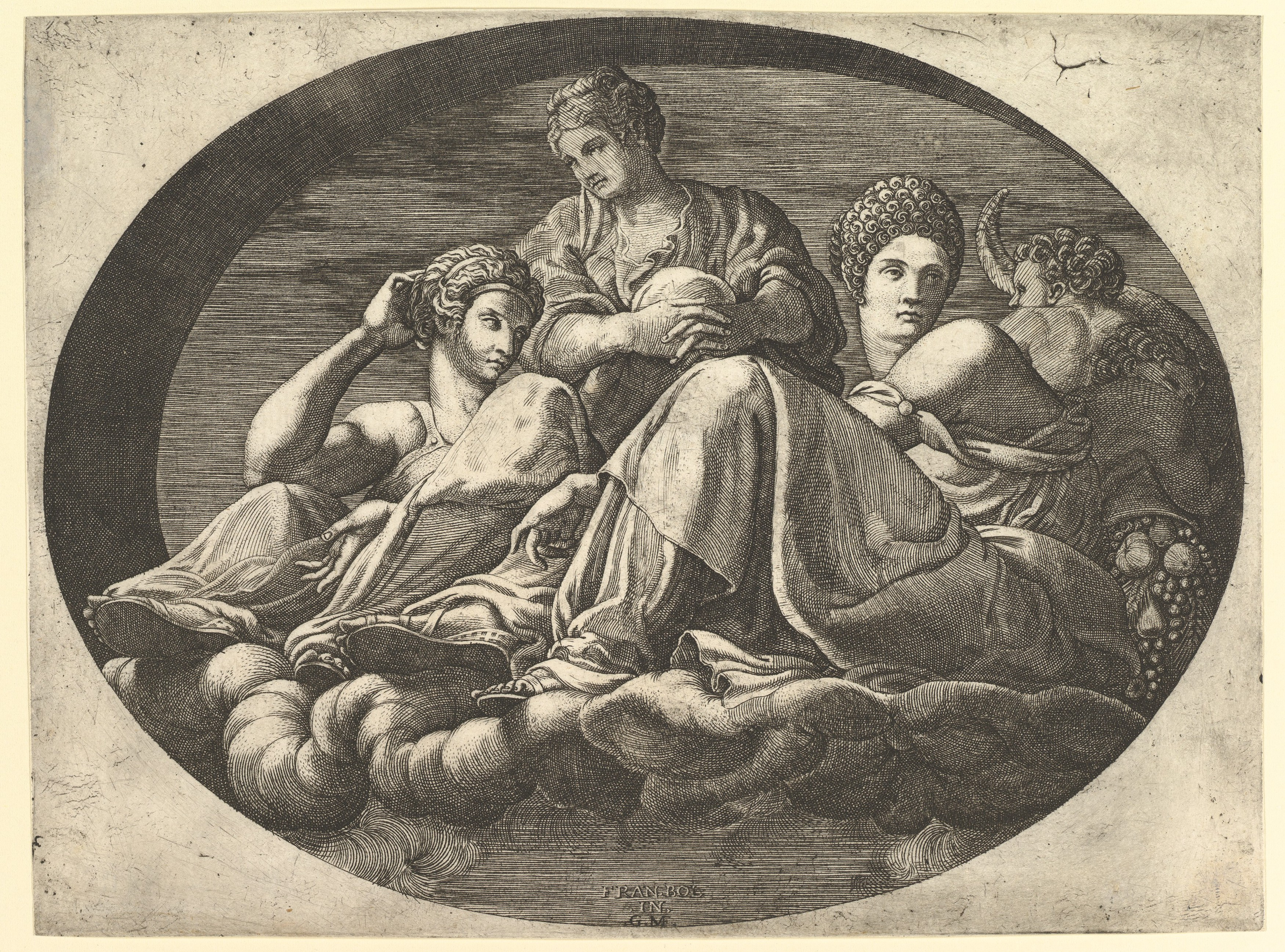
Ceres Seated on Clouds with Two Goddesses and Two Putti, from a series of eight compositions after Francesco Primaticcio's designs for the ceiling of the Ulysses Gallery (destroyed 1738–39) at Fontainebleau

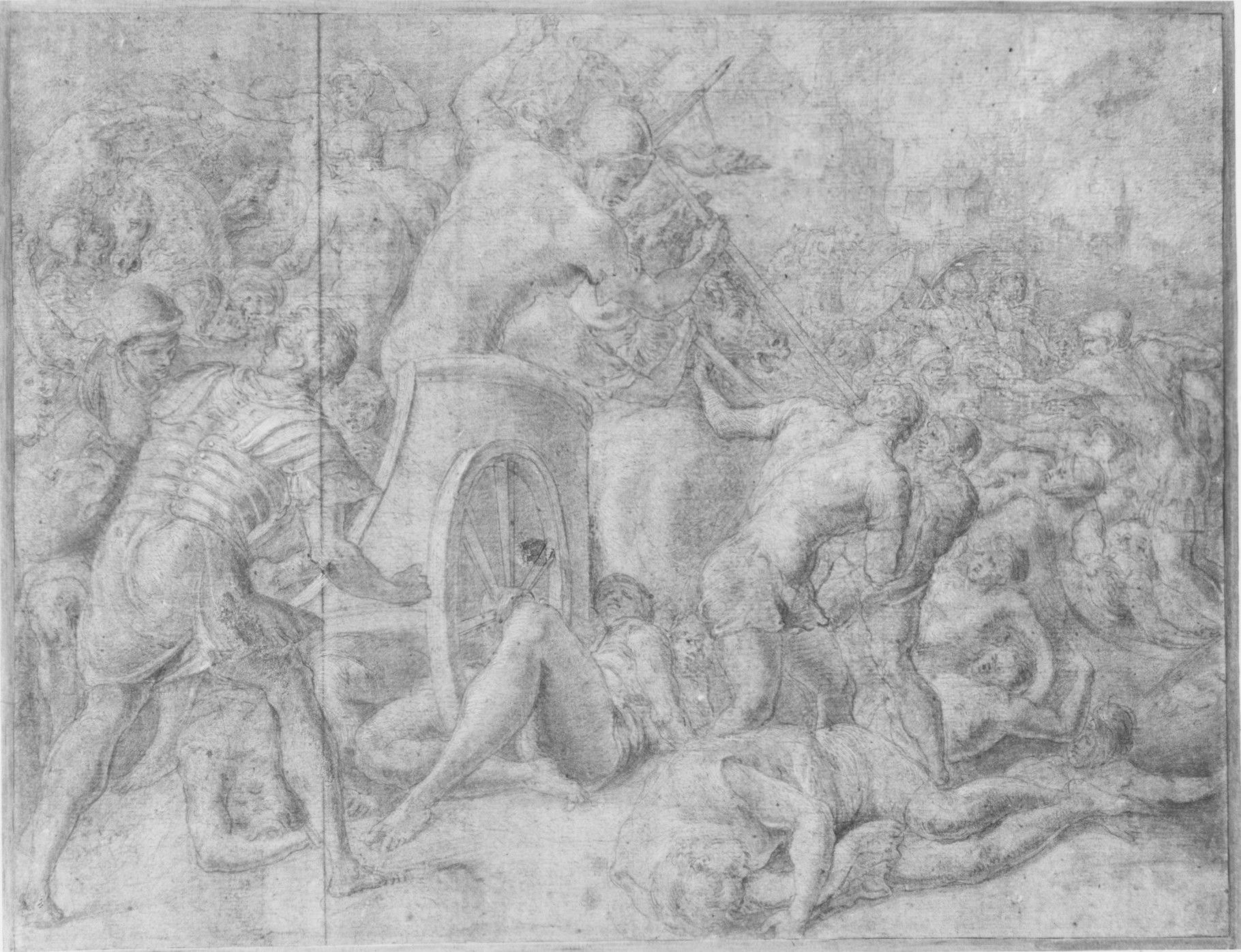
Ulysses and His Companions Fighting the Cicones Before the City of Ismaros, Study for a Destroyed Fresco in the Galerie d'Ulysee, Château de Fontainebleau
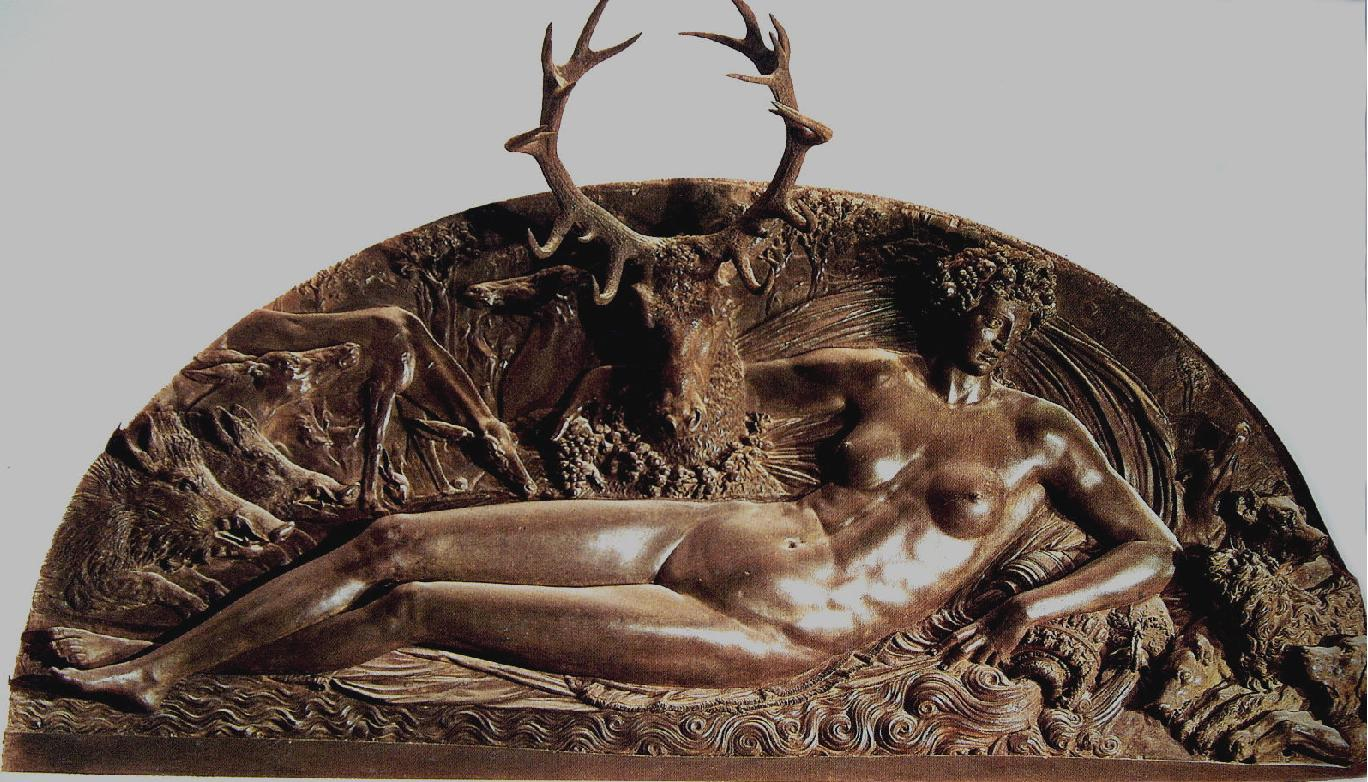
The Nymph of Fontainebleau, by Benevenuto Cellini, now in the Louvre (1542)

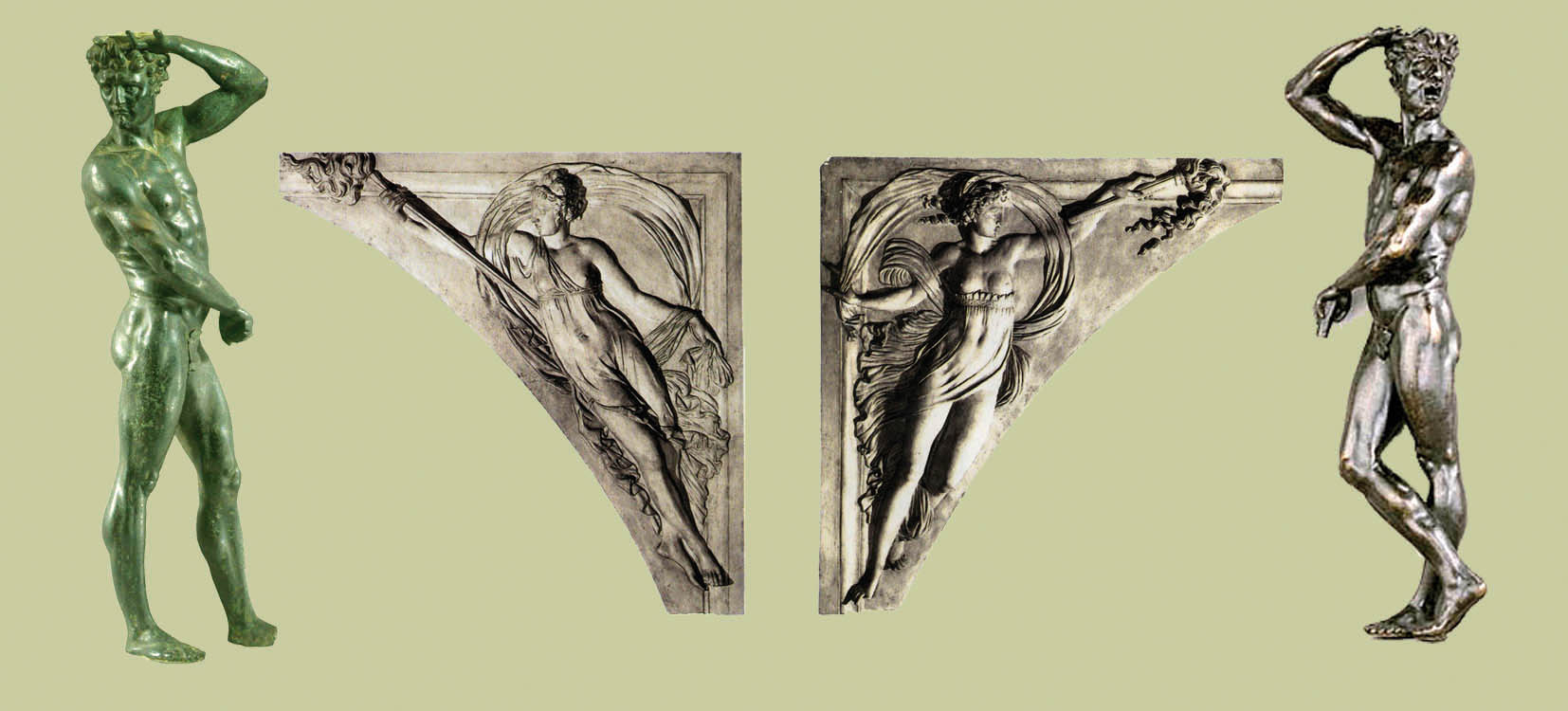
The 1542 Cellini statues and sculptures which would have flanked the Nymphe de Fontainebleau

In 1531, the Florentine artist Rosso Fiorentino, having lost most of his possessions at the Sack of Rome in 1527, was invited by Francis I to work on the interior of the palace. In 1532 he was joined by another Italian artist, Francesco Primaticcio (from Bologna). Rosso died in France in 1540. On the advice of Primaticcio, Niccolò dell'Abbate (from Modena) was invited to France in 1552 by François's son Henry II. Other notable artists included:

- Juste de Juste (c.1505–1559), Franco-Italian sculptor and etcher
- Luca Penni (c.1500/1504–1556), Italian painter
- Francesco Scibec da Carpi (died c.1557), Italian furniture maker
- Benvenuto Cellini (1500–1570), Italian sculptor, goldsmith, silversmith

The works of this "first school of Fontainebleau" are characterized by the extensive use of stucco (moldings and picture frames) and frescos, and an elaborate (and often mysterious) system of allegories and mythological iconography. Renaissance decorative motifs such as grotesques, strapwork and putti are common, as well as a certain degree of eroticism. The figures are elegant and show the influence of the techniques of the Italian Mannerism of Michelangelo, Raphael and especially Parmigianino. Primaticcio was also directed to make copies of antique Roman statues for the king, thus spreading the influence of classical statuary. Many of the works of Rosso, Primaticcio and Niccolò dell'Abbate have not survived as parts of the château were remodelled at various dates. The paintings of the group were reproduced in prints, mostly etchings, which were apparently produced initially at Fontainebleau itself, and later in Paris. These disseminated the style through France and beyond, and also record several paintings that have not survived.

From 1584 to 1594, during the Wars of Religion work inside the palace was abandoned. Upon his ascension to the throne, Henry IV undertook a renovation of the Fontainebleau buildings using a group of artists: the Flemish born Ambroise Dubois (from Antwerp) and the Parisians Toussaint Dubreuil and Martin Fréminet. They are sometimes referred to as the "second school of Fontainebleau". Their late mannerist works, many of which have been lost, continued in the use of elongated and undulating forms and crowded compositions. Many of their subjects include mythological scenes and scenes from works of fiction by the Italian Torquato Tasso and the ancient Greek novelist Heliodorus of Emesa.

The important artists of the second school (from 1594) were:

- Ambroise Dubois (c.1542–1614) (Flemish born)
- Toussaint Dubreuil (c.1561–1602)
- Martin Fréminet (1567–1619)

The mannerist style of the Fontainebleau school influenced French artists (with whom the Italians worked) such as the painter Jean Cousin the Elder, the sculptors Jean Goujon and Germain Pilon, and, to a lesser degree, the painter and portraitist François Clouet the son of Jean Clouet. The Fontainebleau style combined allegorical paintings in moulded plasterwork where the framing was treated as if it were leather or paper, slashed and rolled into scrolls and combined with arabesques and grotesques. Fontainebleau ideals of female beauty are Mannerist: a small neat head on a long neck, exaggeratedly long torso and limbs, small high breasts—almost a return to Late Gothic beauties. The new works at Fontainebleau were recorded in refined and detailed engravings that circulated among connoisseurs and artists. Through the engravings by the "School of Fontainebleau" this new style was transmitted to other northern European centers, Antwerp especially, Germany, and eventually London.

While Louis XIV spent more time at Fontainebleau than any other monarch, he made most of his modifications to gardens, rather than the interiors and decor. In the 18th century, interiors underwent major changes in style. Between 1750 and 1754, the architect Ange-Jacques Gabriel built a new residential wing and new apartments for Louis XV and the Queen. The most famous artists of the period, including François Boucher, Charles-André van Loo, Alexis Peyrotte and Jean-Baptiste Marie Pierre were commissioned to paint works for the Council Chamber. Louis XVI continued the decoration work, particularly in the Turkish cabinet (1777) and the game room and boudoir of the Queen (1786–1787), in an arabesque style up to the eve of the Revolution. Fontainebleau offers many of the best examples of interior design at the end of the Ancien régime.

Napoleon I wished to continue the traditional grandeur of the monarchy, and had the palace completely refurnished. He created a new suite of rooms with the symbols and style of the Empire, and transformed the former king's bedroom into his throne room. It is the only throne room in France which is still in its original state with its original furniture. The rooms Napoleon used at Fontainebleau are among the best existing examples of the Empire style.

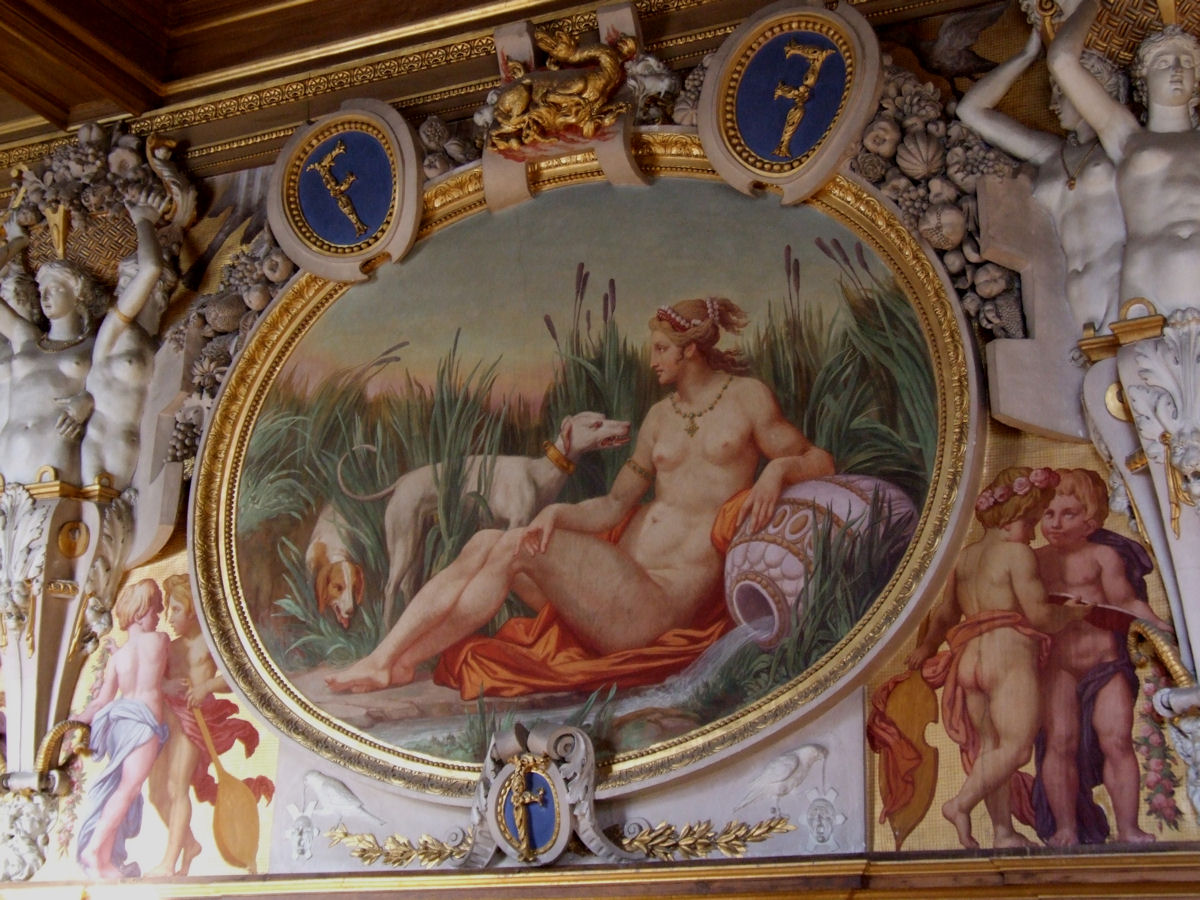
Painting by Rosso Fiorentino in the Gallery of Francis I (1533–1539)

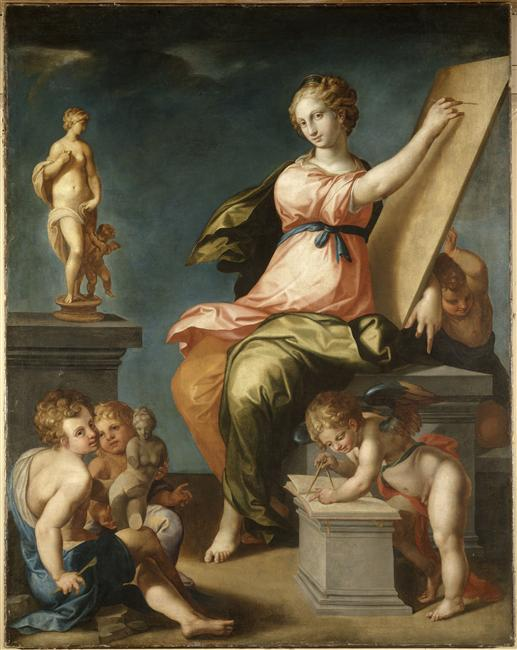
Allegory of painting and sculpture, by Ambroise Dubois (1543–1614)

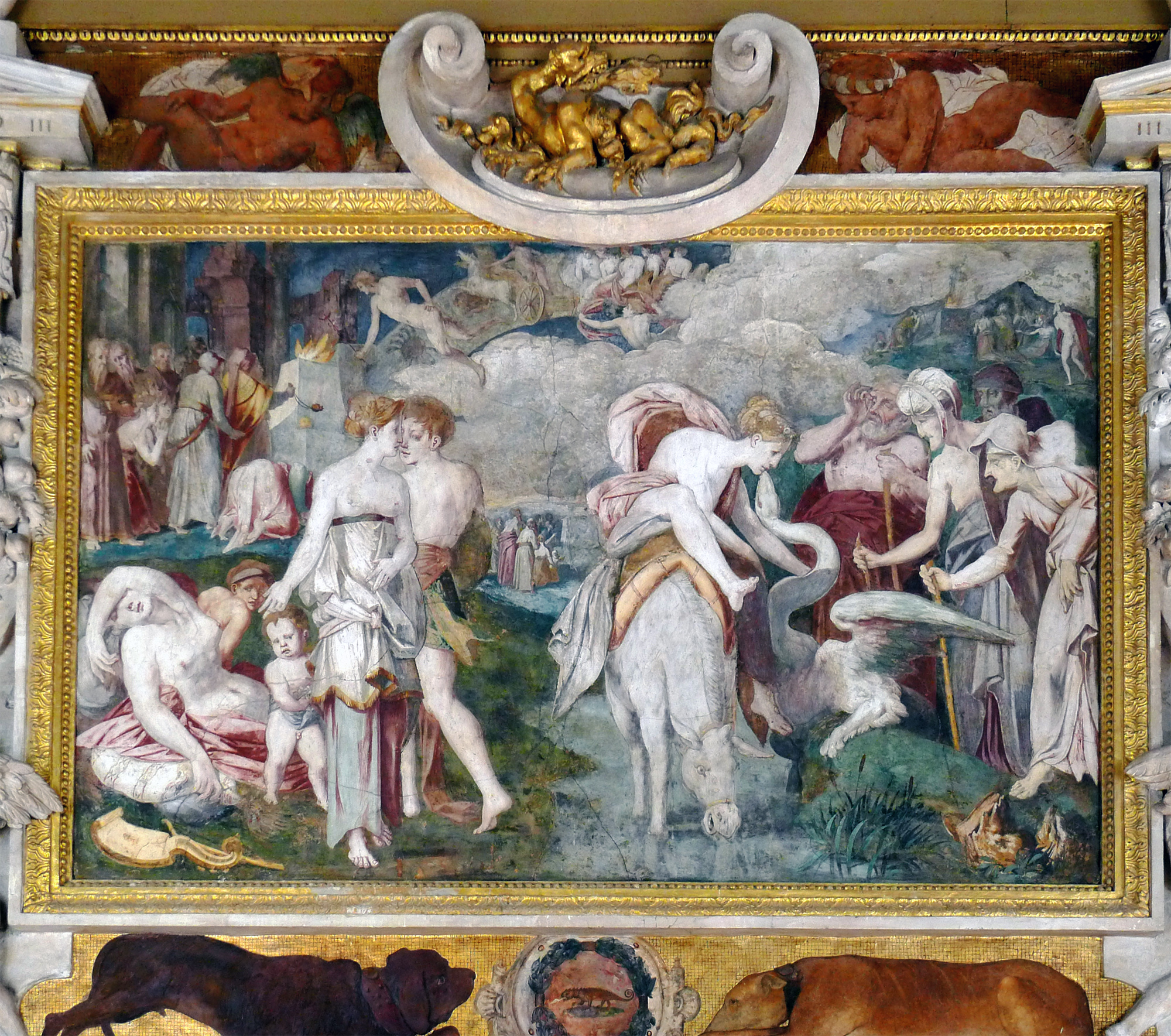
Panel in the Gallery of Francis I. (Mid-16th century).

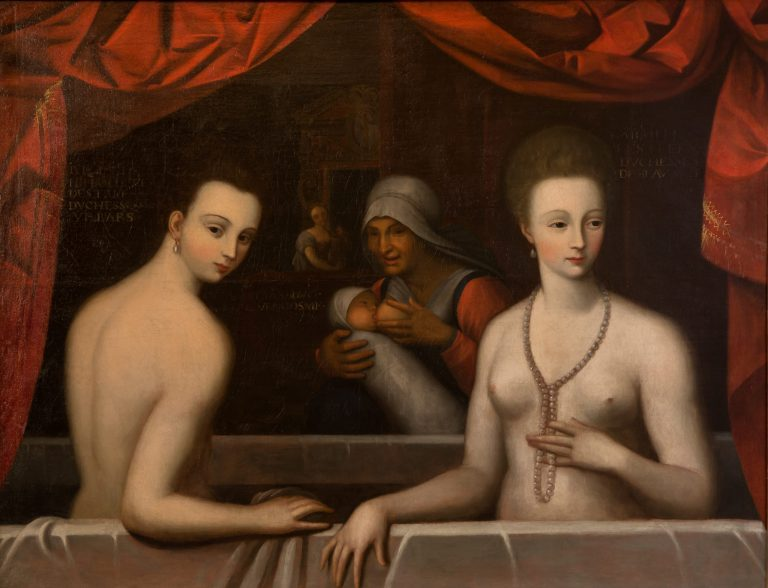
Portrait of Gabrielle d'Estrées and her sister, the Duchess of Villars, c.1594

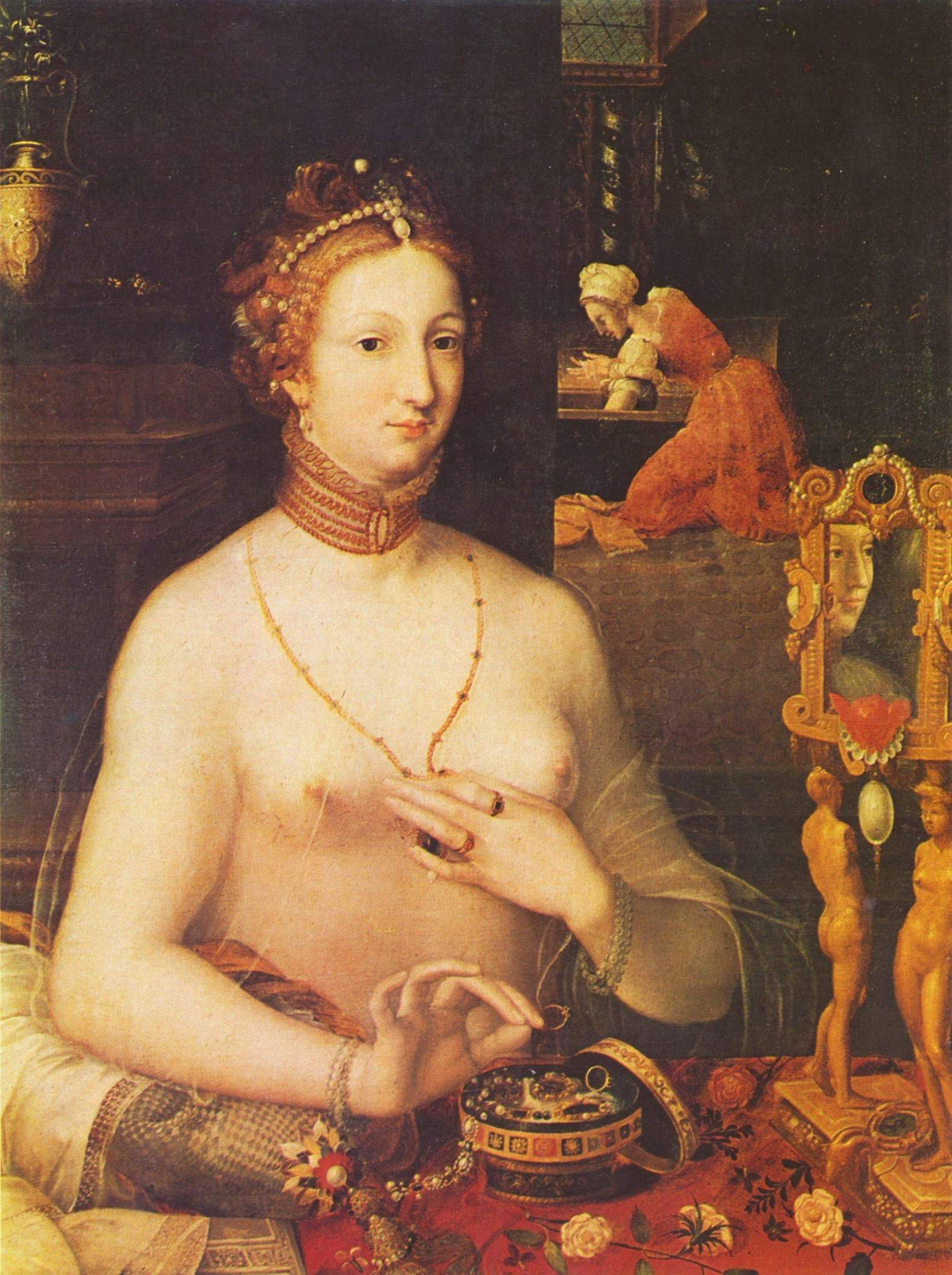
Master of the school of Fontainebleau, Lady at her Toilet (1585–1595) (Musée des Beaux-Arts de Dijon)

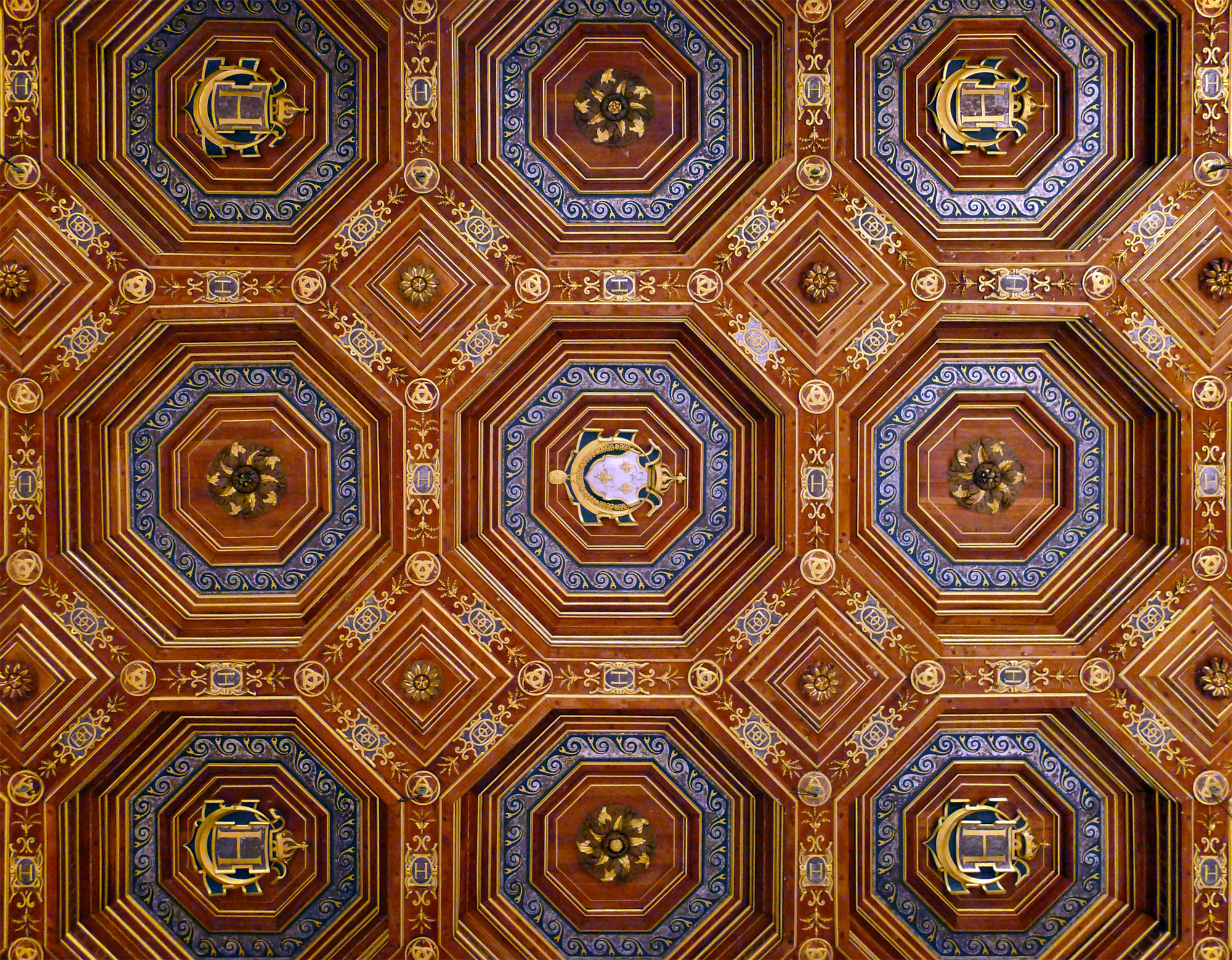
The ceiling of the ballroom, designed by Philibert de l'Orme, with the symbols of Henri II and his mistress Diane de Poitiers: "HD" cyphers, three interlaced crescent moons, and Henri II's main cypher: a crowned H above a crescent moon

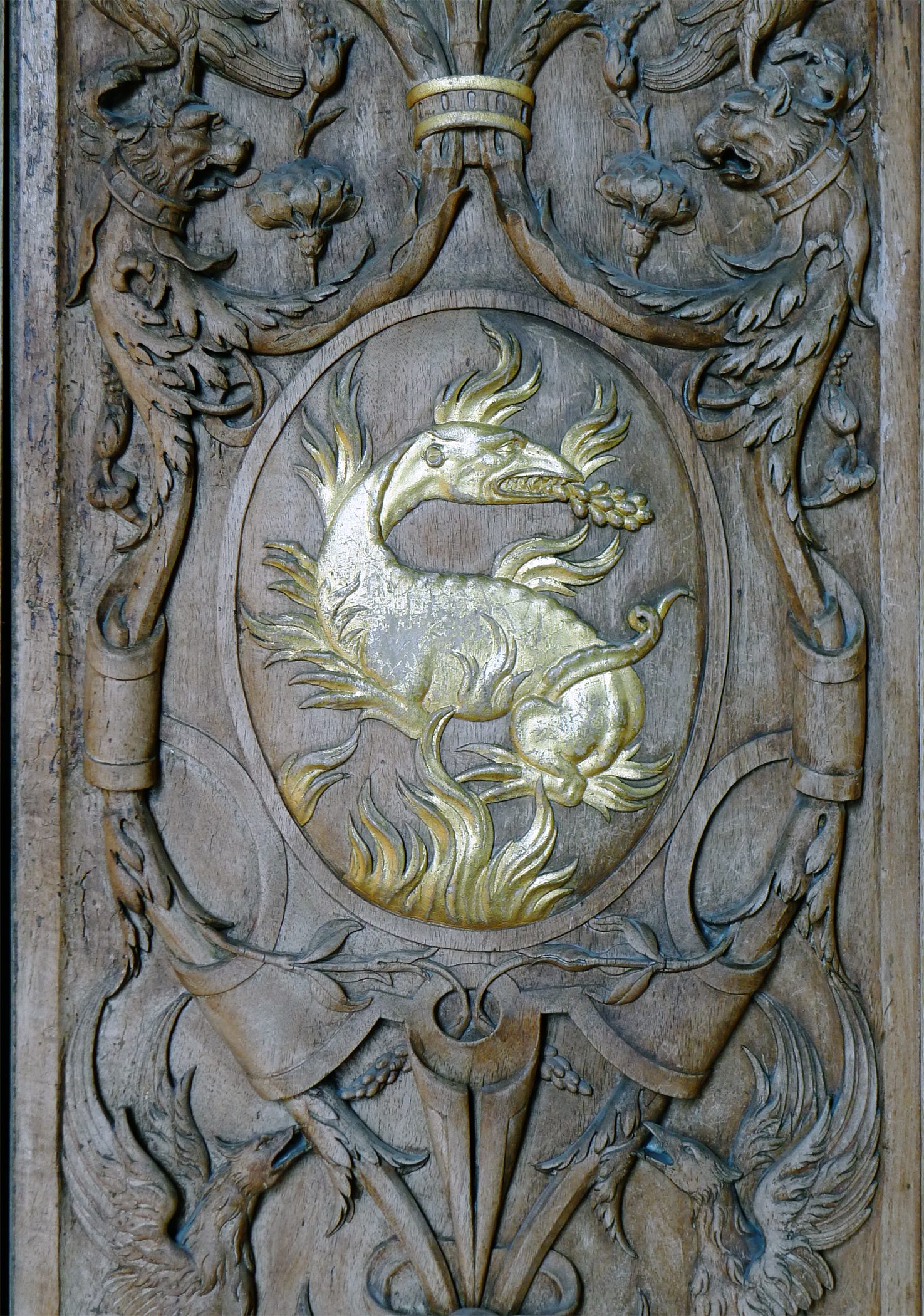
Decorative carved panel in the Gallery of Francis I, with his emblem, the salamander (mid 16th century).

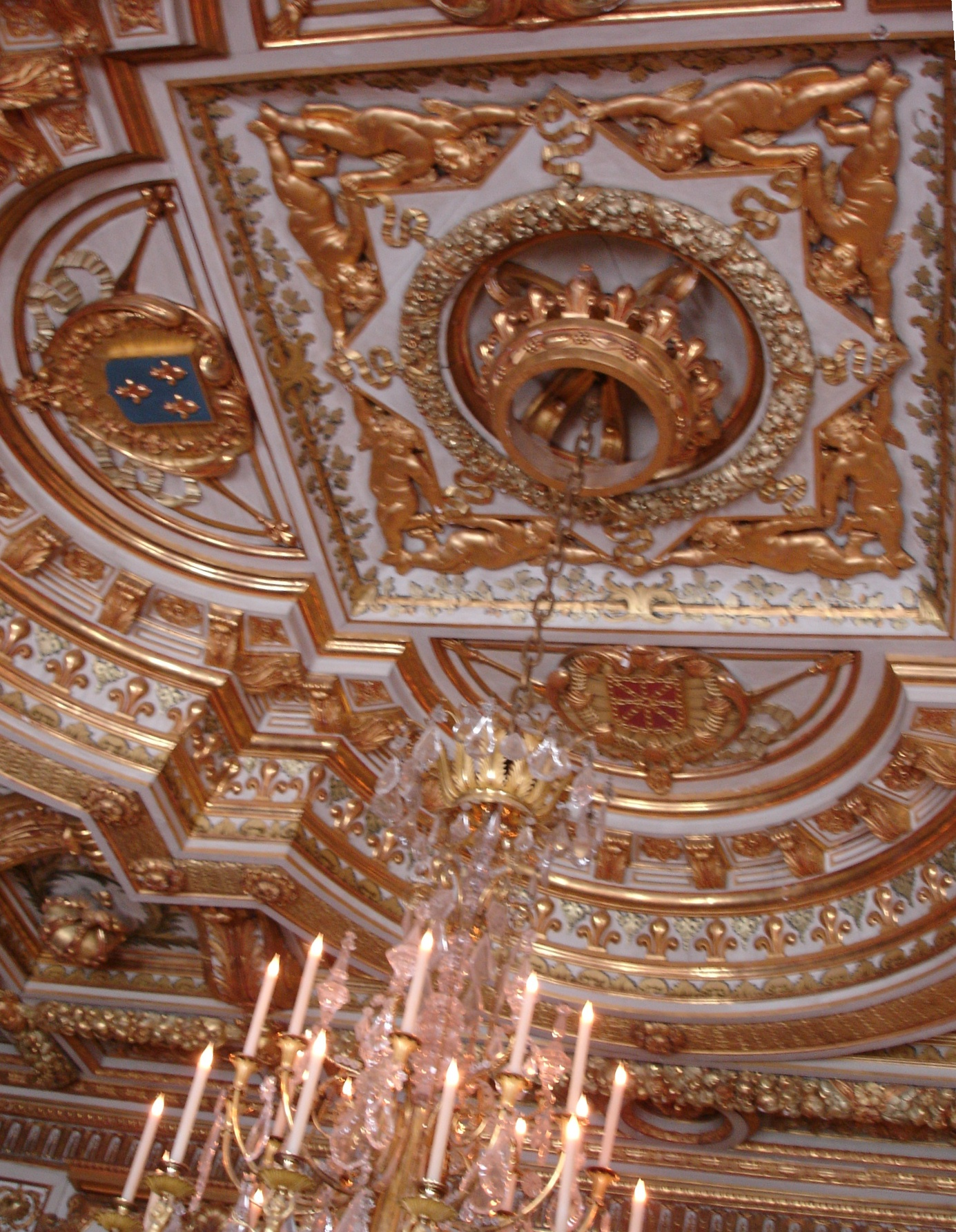
The ceiling of the throne room of Napoleon I. The ceiling was originally made for Louis XIII in the 17th century, when this was his bedroom.

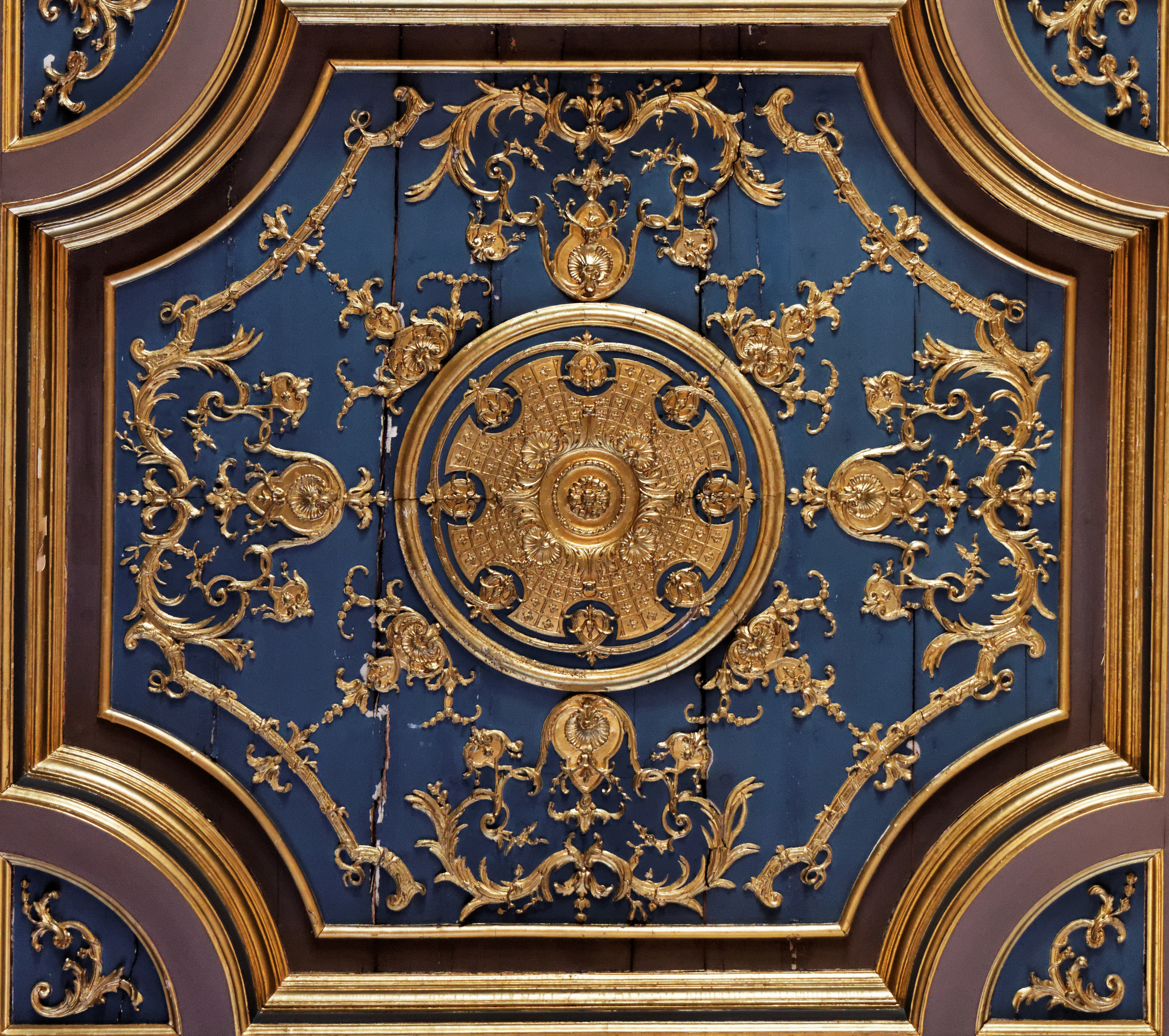
Ceiling panel in the hall of Saint Louis, built by Louis XV (18th century)

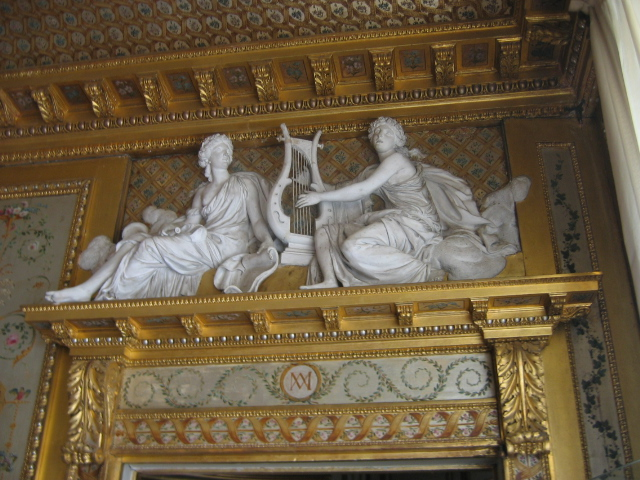
Decoration over the door in the boudoir of Marie Antoinette, with her initials, (late 18th century).

== Museum of Napoleon I ==
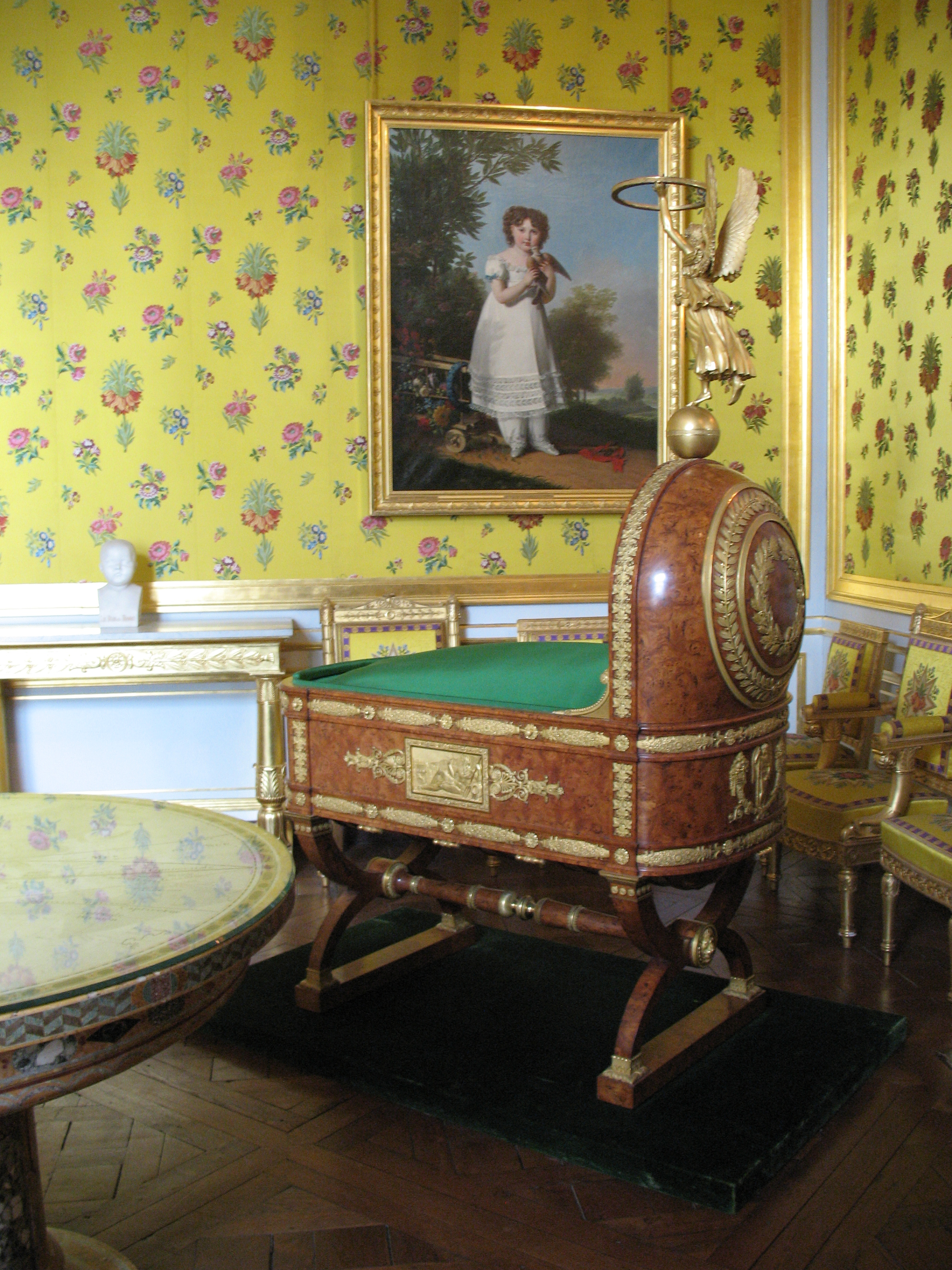
Cradle of the King of Rome in the Museum of Napoleon I

The Museum of Napoleon I was created in 1986 in the wing on the right side of the Court of Honor, where the apartments of the princes of the First Empire had been located. It includes a gallery of portraits of members of Napoleon's family, medals and decorations, several costumes worn during Napoleon's coronation as Emperor, and a gold leaf from the crown he wore during the coronation; a large collection of porcelain and decorative objectives from the Imperial dining table, and a cradle, toys, and other souvenirs from the Emperor's son, the King of Rome. It also has a collection of souvenirs from his military campaigns, including a recreation of his tent and its furnishings and practical items which he took with him on his campaigns.

== See also ==
- Treaty of Fontainebleau
- Chasselas de Thomery
- List of tourist attractions in Paris
- Claude François Denecourt
