= Nymph of Fontainebleau =

Sculpture by Benvenuto Cellini

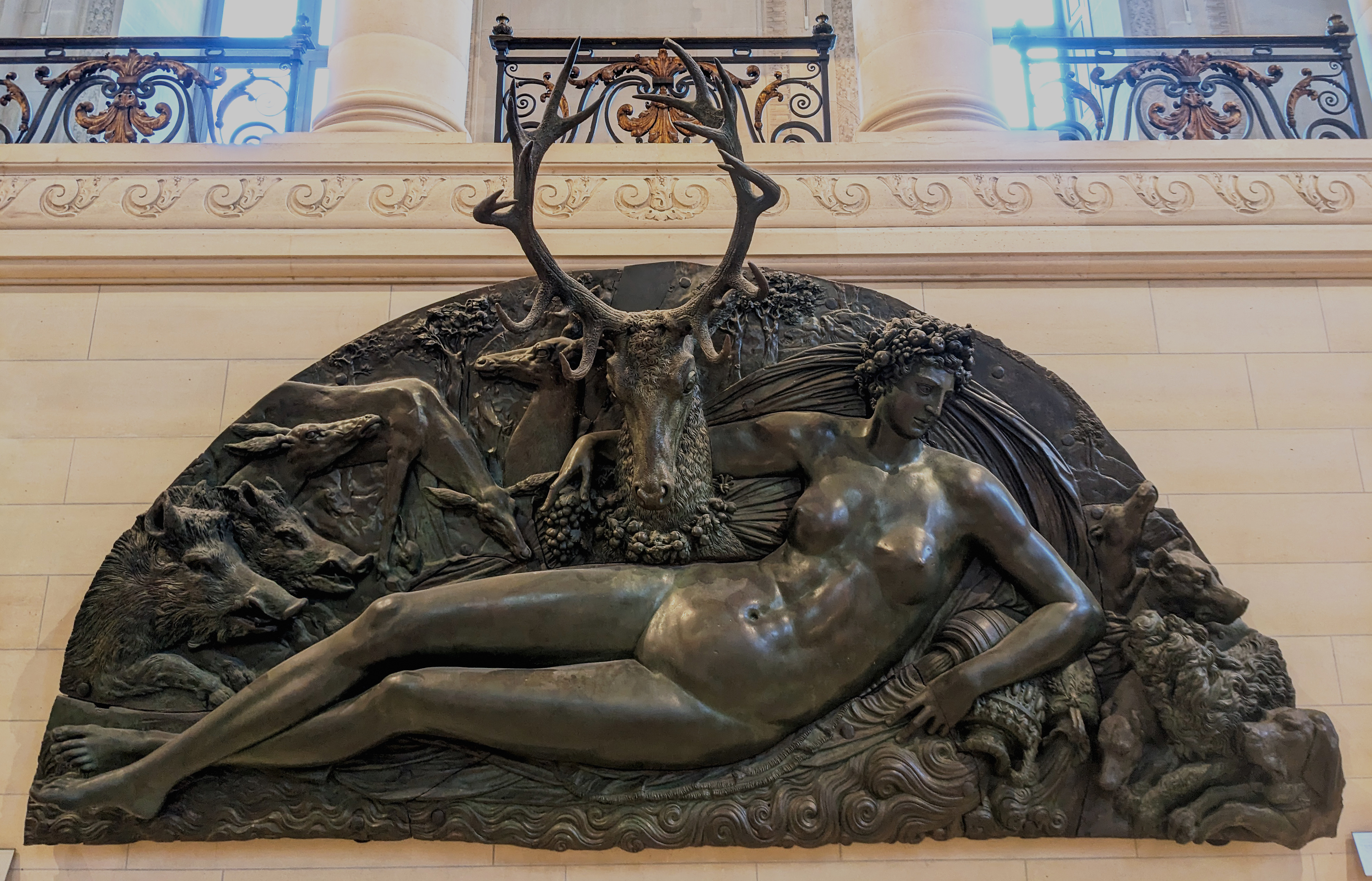
Nymph of Fontainebleau at the Louvre (H. 2.05 m; L. 4.09 m)

The Nymph of Fontainebleau (French: Nymphe de Fontainebleau), also known as the Nymph of Anet (French: Nymphe d'Anet) or the Nymph with the Stag (French: Nymphe au cerf), is a c.‑1543 bronze relief (Paris, Louvre, MR 1706), created by the Italian sculptor Benvenuto Cellini for the Château de Fontainebleau in France. It features a long-limbed reclining nude female nymph with a stag, wild boars, dogs, and other animals. It was Cellini's first large scale bronze casting.

== History ==
The sculpture was commissioned by François I, executed in Cellini's workshop at the Hôtel de Nesle (adjacent to the Tour de Nesle) in Paris, sculpted with the help of Thomas Dambry, Pierre Bontemps and Laurent Mailleu, and assembled with the help of foundrymen Pierre Villain and Guillaume Saligot. Originally intended to be placed in the tympanum in the arch above the entrance of the Porte Dorée ("Golden Gate") at the Château de Fontainebleau, it was never installed there, but instead was used by the architect Philibert de L'Orme, who put it above the entrance gate (built c. 1552) of the Château d'Anet, where the nymph became identified with Diana, the goddess of the hunt, representing the owner of the château, Diane de Poitiers, and the stag with her lover Henri II of France.

The relief was seized on 23 March 1794, at the time of the French Revolution, and moved from Anet to the Nesle depot. According to the French historian Maurice Roy, it was initially intended for the Musée des Monuments Français in Paris and was later replaced in Anet by a painted plaster cast. On 23 February 1796, the Conservatoire des Arts decided it should be moved to the small courtyard of the Louvre, but in 1797, when it was actually moved to the Louvre, it was placed in the gallery of the museum.

After the sculpture's restoration in 1811 by the father and son founder-chasers (French: ciseleurs) Delafontaine, it was installed by the architect Pierre-François Fontaine over the Caryatides Balcony in the Salle des Caryatides of the Lescot Wing, where it remained until 1847, when it was replaced with a cast by Antoine-Louis Barye and transferred to the Sculptures rooms. It was later moved to a landing of the Mollien Staircase above the ground floor of the Denon Wing of the Louvre, where it is currently on display.

The Nymph of Fontainebleau and its replicas

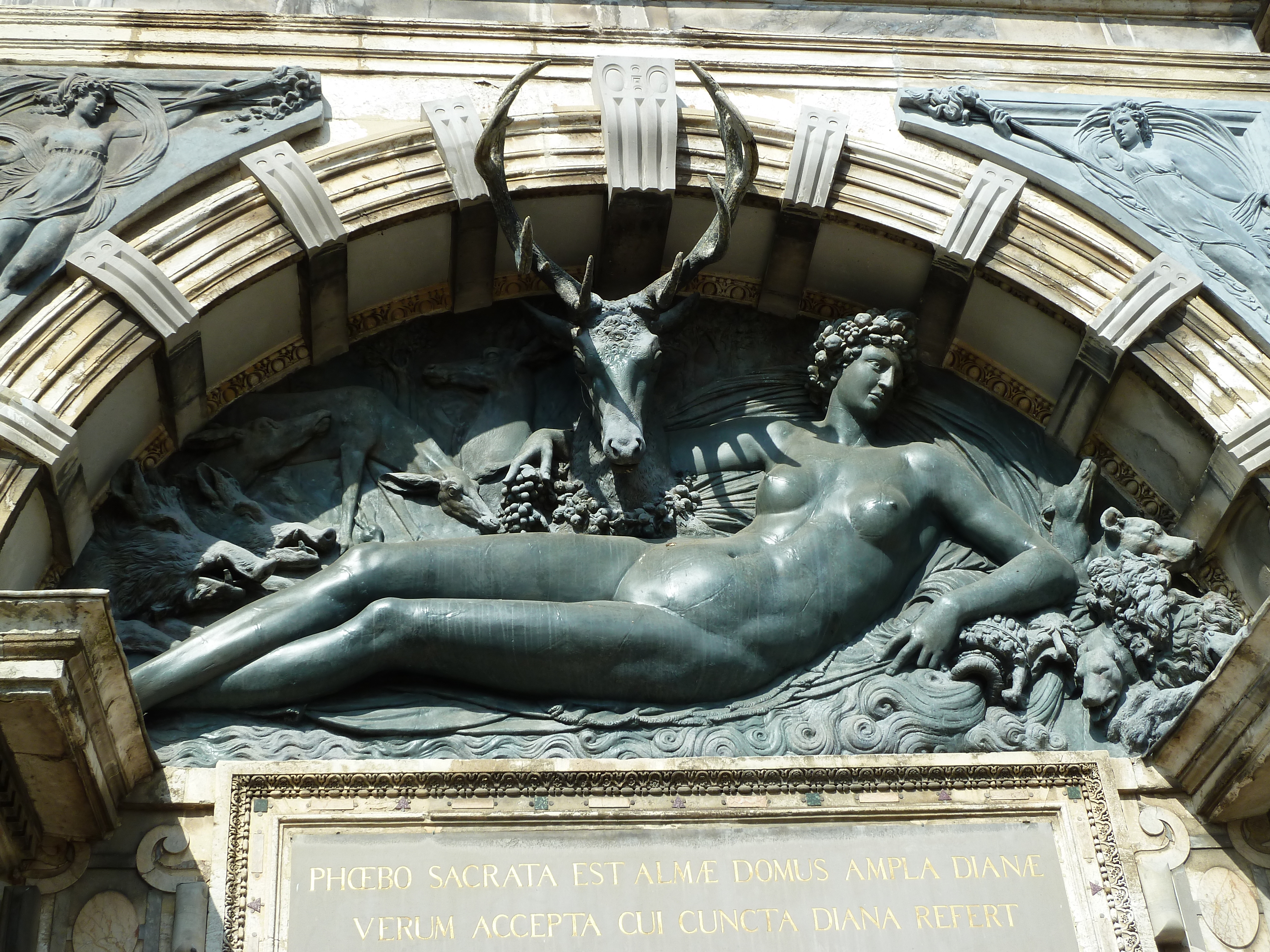
Replica at the Château d'Anet

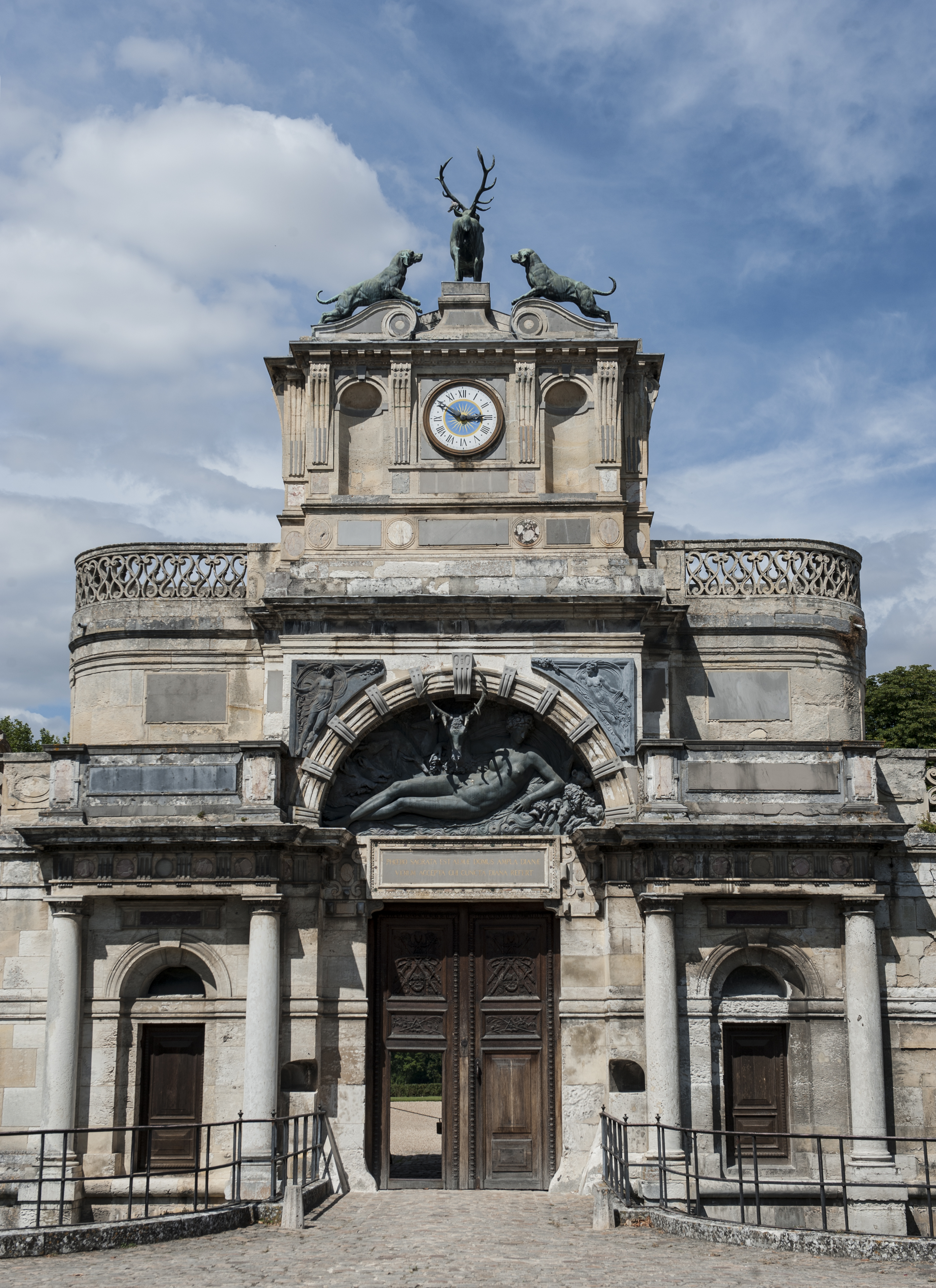
Long view showing its location above the entrance gate at Anet

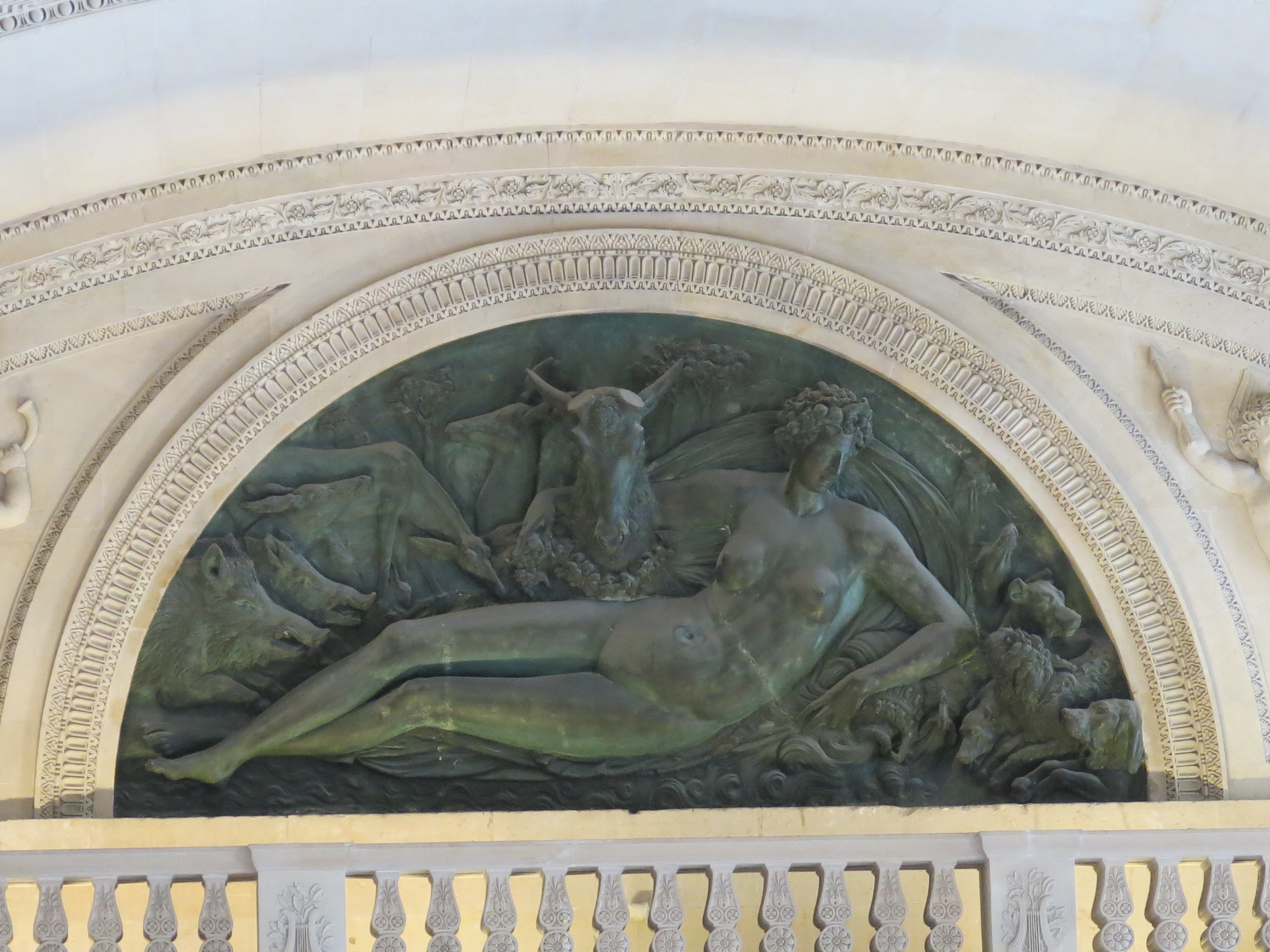
Replica in the Salle des Caryatides of the Louvre

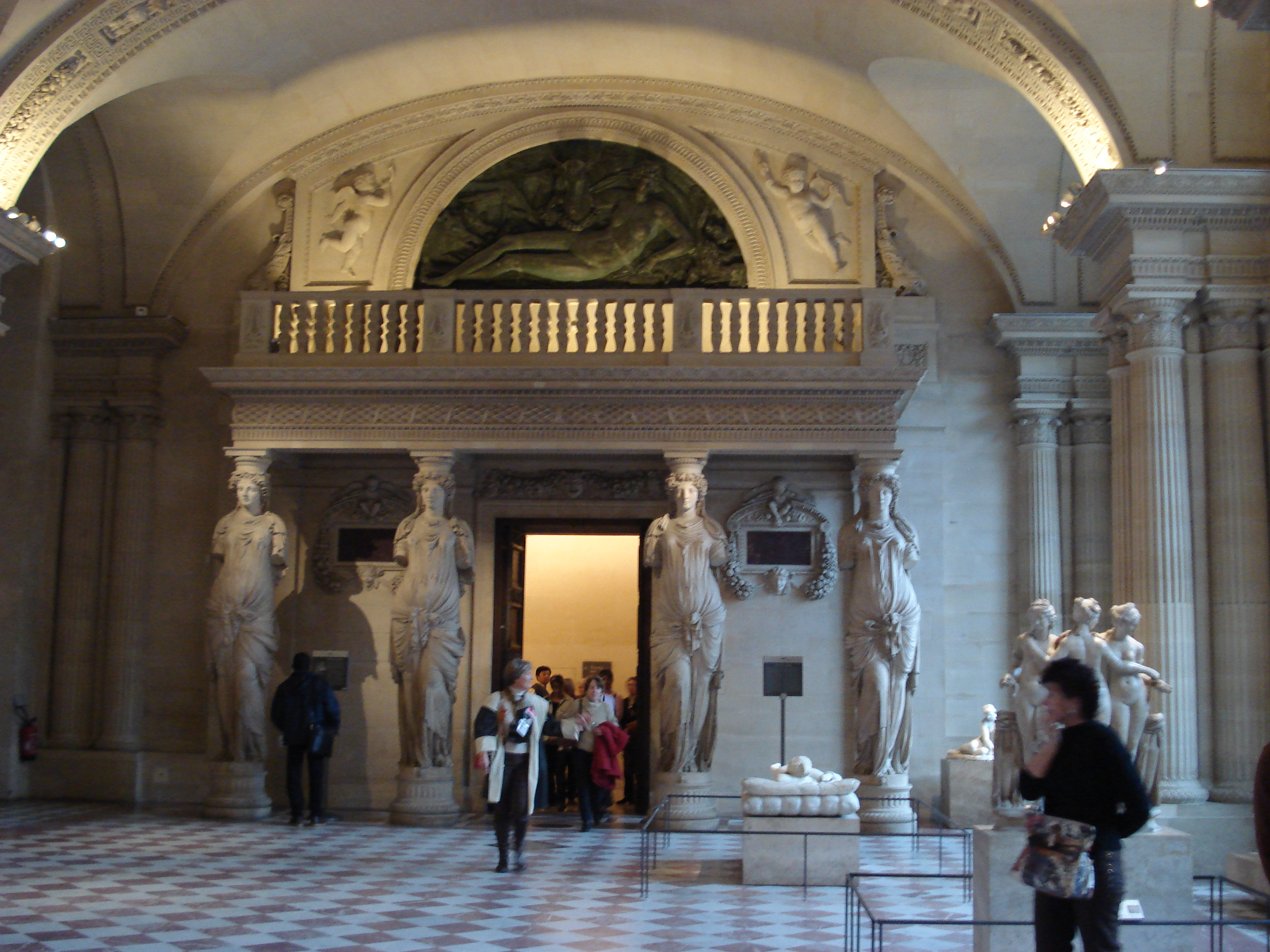
Long view showing the Nymph above the balcony supported by the four caryatids sculpted by Jean Goujon

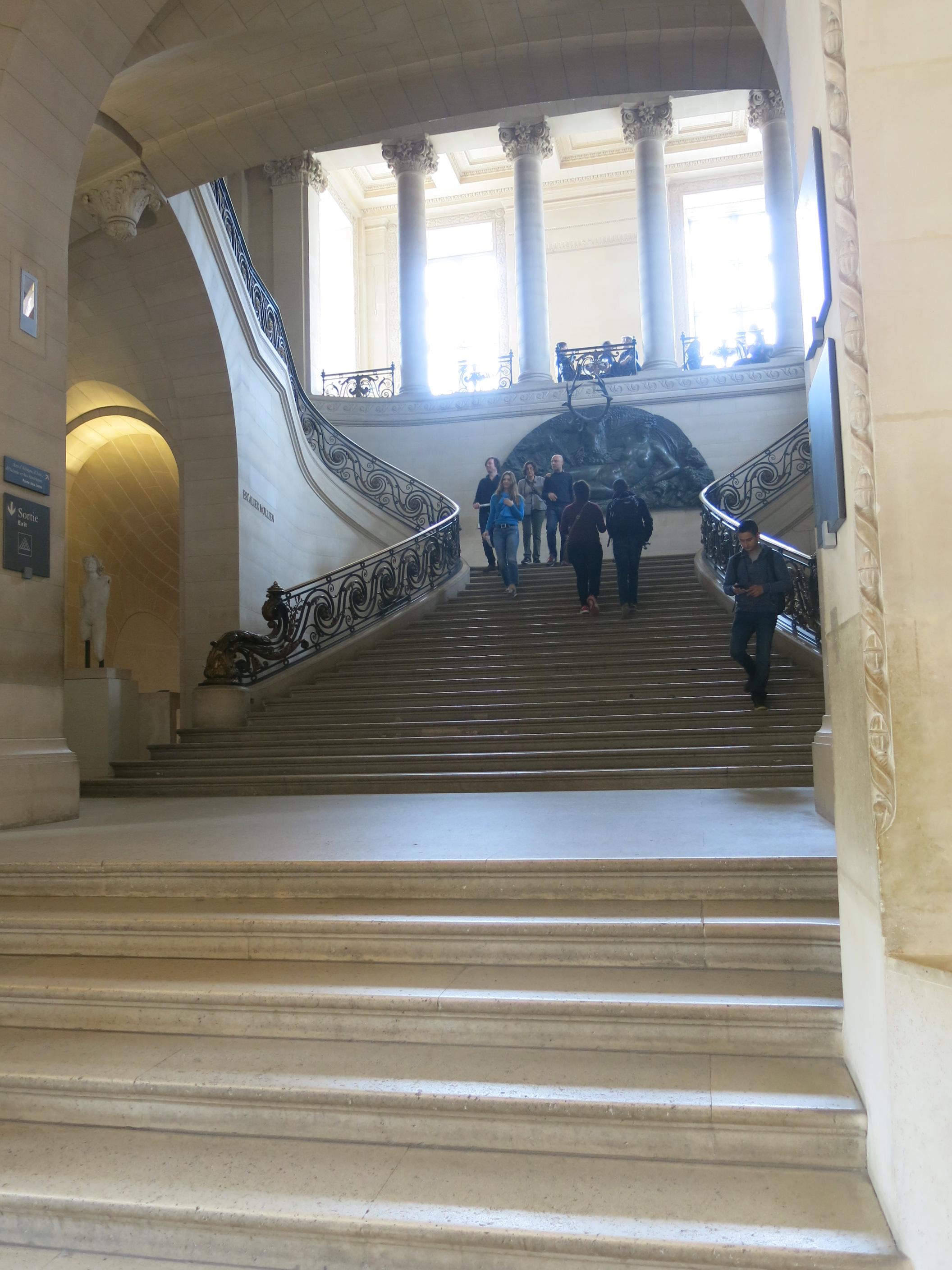
Long view showing its location on the Mollien Stairs of the Louvre

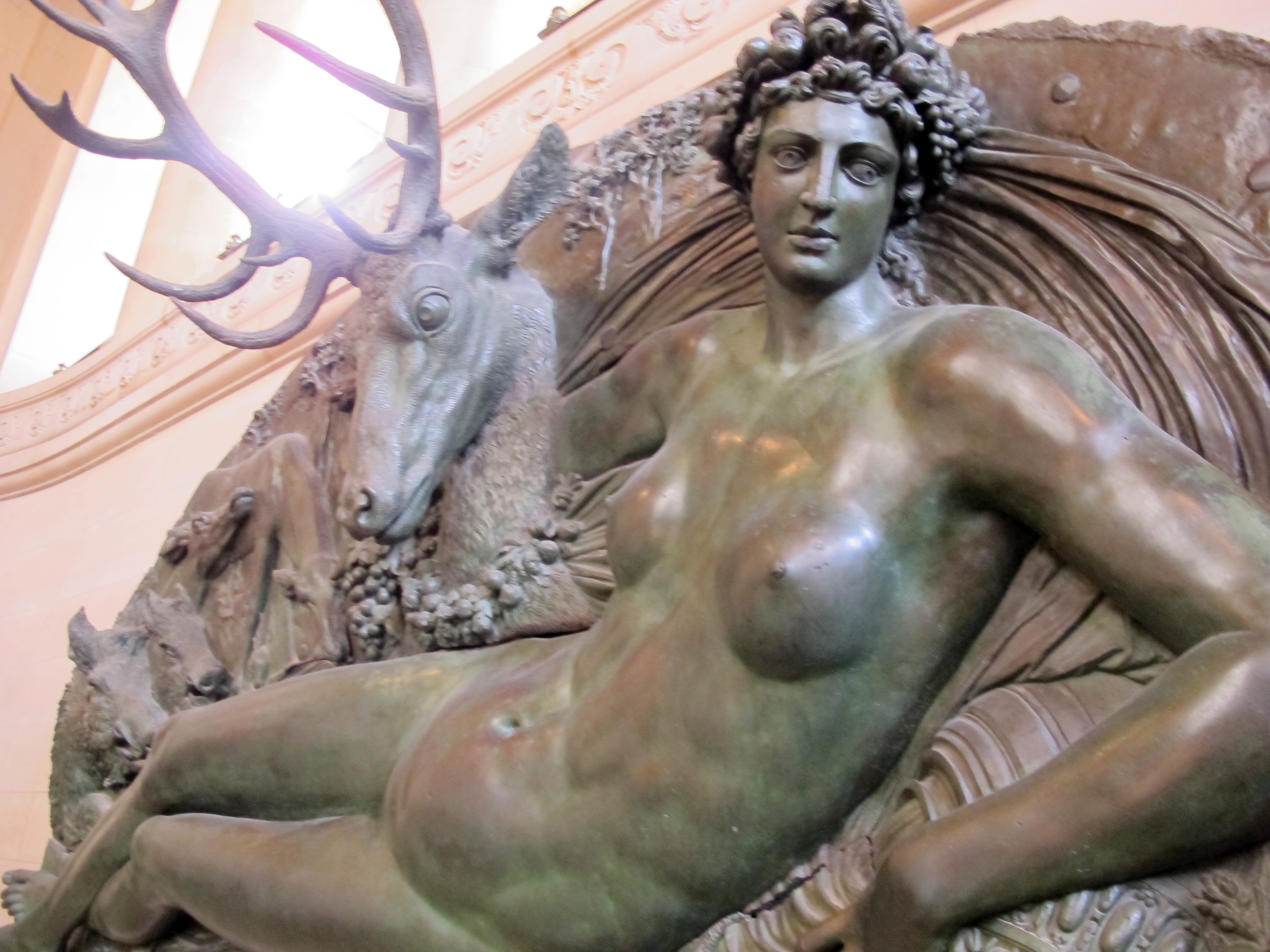
Close-up view of the original bronze by Cellini

== See also ==
- Fountain of Diana
- Diana of Versailles
- Perseus with the Head of Medusa
- Cellini Salt Cellar

== Bibliography ==
- Babelon, Jean-Pierre (1989). Châteaux de France au siècle de la Renaissance. Paris: Picard. ISBN 2708403877.
- Dunlop, Ian (1996). The Companion Guide to The Country Round Paris. Rochester: New York. ISBN 1900639009. Originally published 1979 as The Companion Guide to the Ile de France. Revised paperback edition 1986. Reissued 1996.
- Nova, Alessandro (1996). "Cellini, Benvenuto", vol. 6, pp. 139–150, in The Dictionary of Art, 34 volumes, edited by Jane Turner. New York: Grove. ISBN 9781884446009. Also at Oxford Art Online.
- Roy, Maurice (1929). Artistes et monuments de la Renaissance en France. Richesses nouvelles et documents inédits / I. - 1re partie.. Paris: Librairie ancienne Honoré Champion. OCLC 742870725.
- Wheeler, Daniel (1979). The Chateaux of France. London: Octopus Books. ISBN 0706412605.
