= Château d'Anet =

Château near Dreux, France

- Anet, Eure-et-Loir, Centre-Val de Loire, France
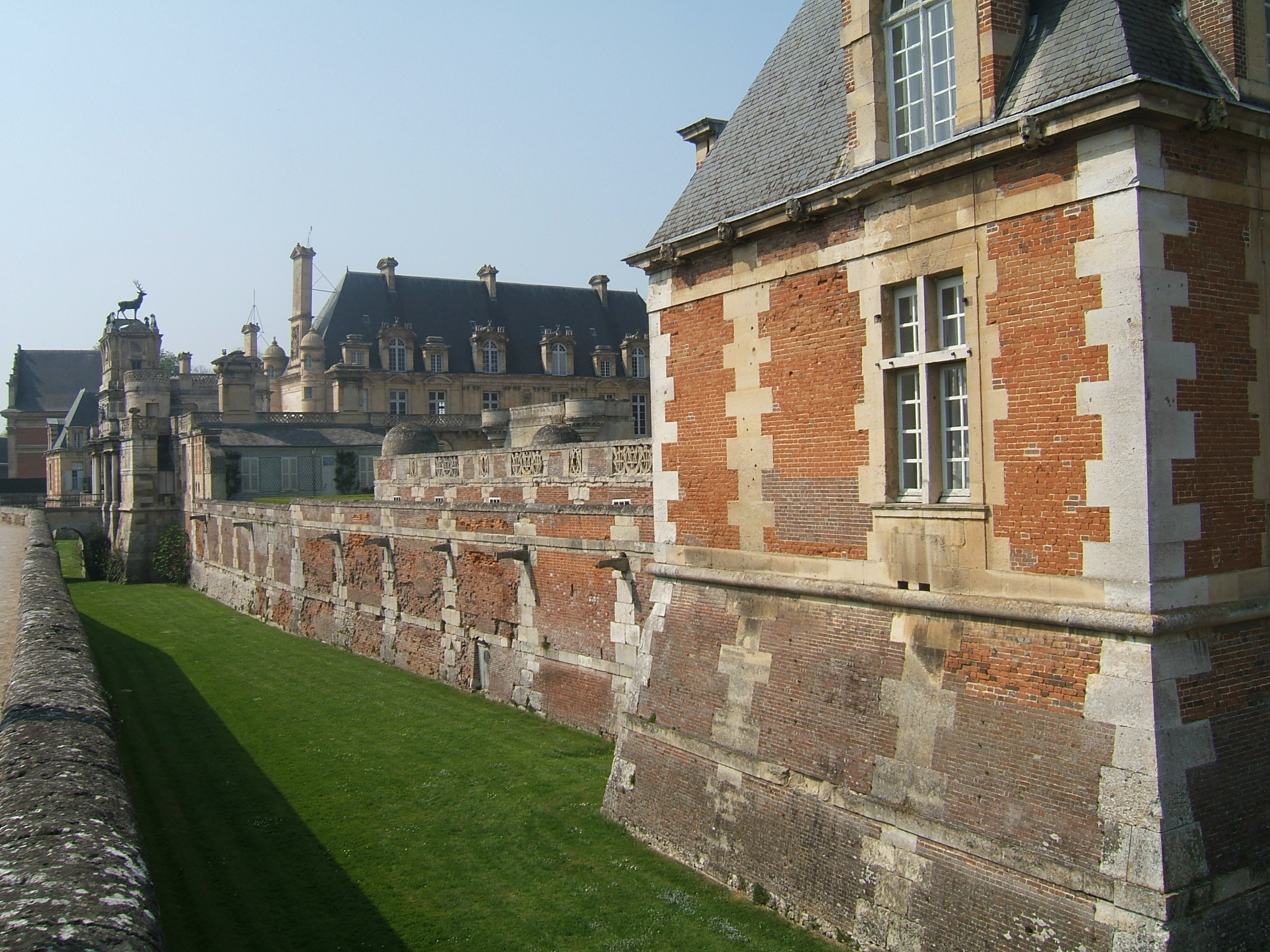

Site information
- Type: château
- Website: https://www.chateaudanet.com

Location
- Coordinates: 48°51′31″N 1°26′18″E

Site history
- Built: 1549

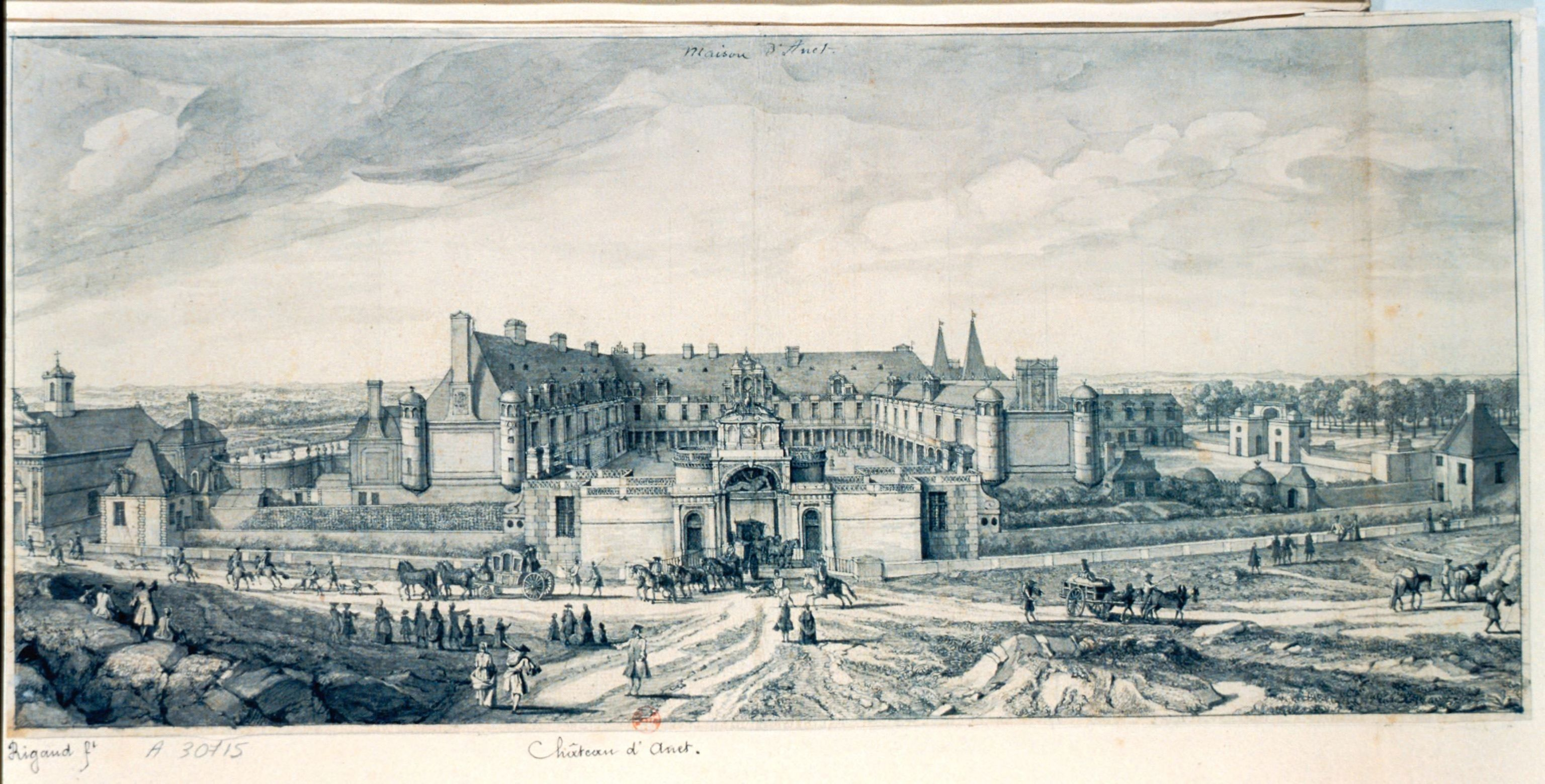
Anet in the 18th century

The Château d'Anet is a château near Dreux, in the Eure-et-Loir department in northern France, built by Philibert de l'Orme from 1547 to 1552 for Diane de Poitiers, the mistress of Henry II of France. It was built on the former château at the center of the domains of Diane's deceased husband, Louis de Brézé, seigneur d'Anet, Marshal of Normandy and Master of the Hunt.

The château is especially noted for its exterior, notably the Fountain of Diana, a statue of Diane de Poitiers as Diana, goddess of the hunt, and the Nymph of Anet, a relief by Benvenuto Cellini over the portal. Anet was the site of one of the first Italianate parterre gardens centered on the building's façade in France; the garden designer in charge was Jacques Mollet, who trained his son at Anet, Claude Mollet, destined to become royal gardener to three French kings.

== History ==
=== Era of Diane de Poitiers and her descendants ===
The château, which faced the south, was built partly upon the foundations and cellar vaults of a feudal castle that had been dismantled by Charles V and was subsequently rebuilt as a Late Gothic manor of brick and stone. The name comes from Simon d'Anet, who owned the chateau in the twelfth century. In 1444, it was given to Pierre de Brézé by Charles VII, in return for Pierre's services in expelling the English from Normandy.

The château of Diane was constructed between 1548 and 1552. It was formed around three courts, with the Cour d'honneur at the center. The kitchens were located off the right-hand court, while the left-hand court accessed an Orangerie and a pavilion known as the Gouvernement – so called because it housed the Gouverneur of the estate. The Gouvernement also housed the Chambre de Trésor (treasury) where the deeds of property and archives of the de Brézé family were kept. Beyond the nucleus of the château were the formal gardens, a square area divided into parterres and surrounded by galleries. Attached to the gallery on the north side, opposite the Chateau, was a suite of baths. Northeast of the right-hand court, also known as the Cour de Charles le Mauvais, were the stables. Even further north from the stables was the Hôtel-Dieu, where the sick servants and dependents of the estate were treated. West of the left-hand court, the Cour de gauche, was Diane's mortuary chapel, as well as an aviary and heronry.

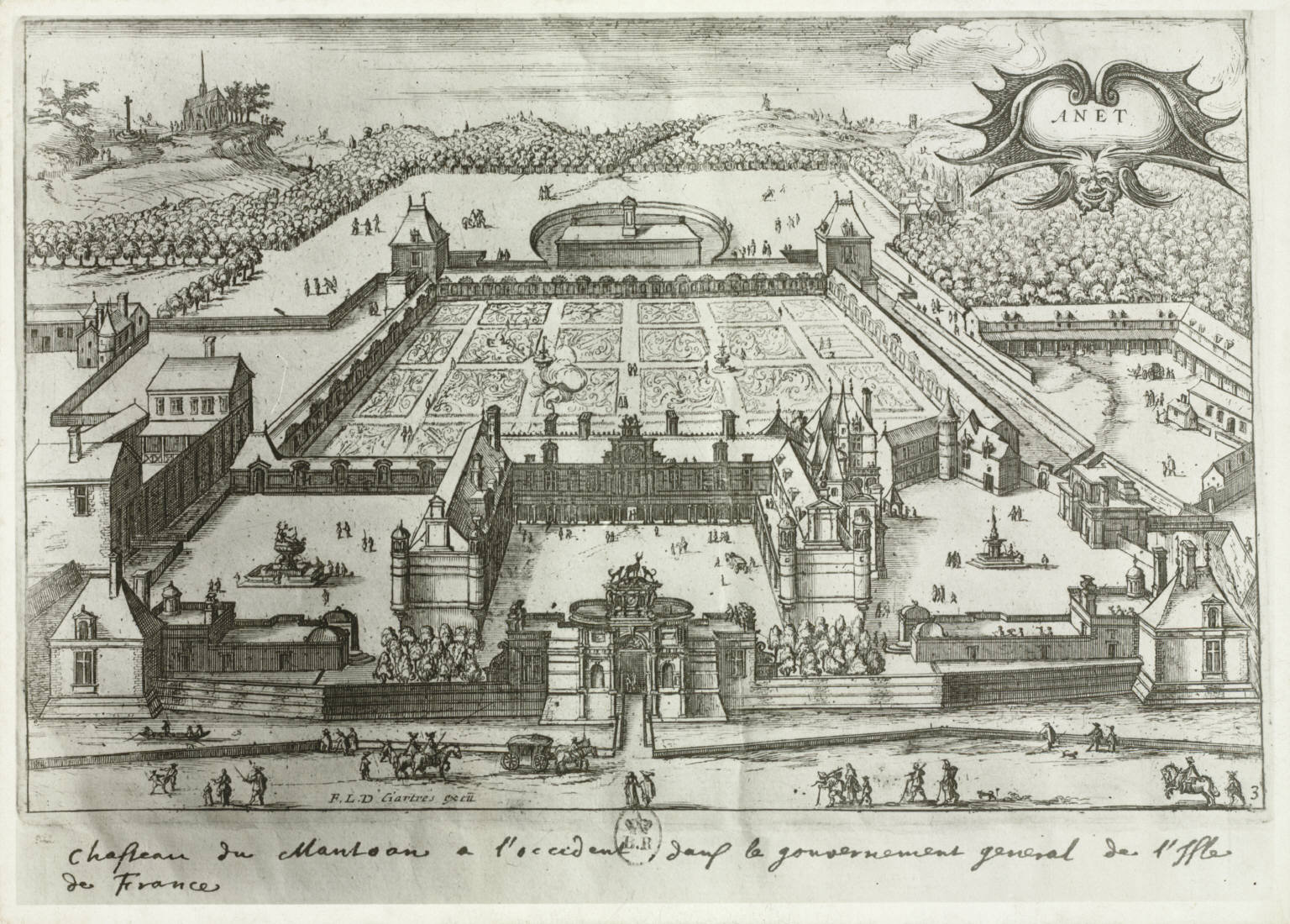
Bird's-eye view, published by François L’Anglois in the early 17th century

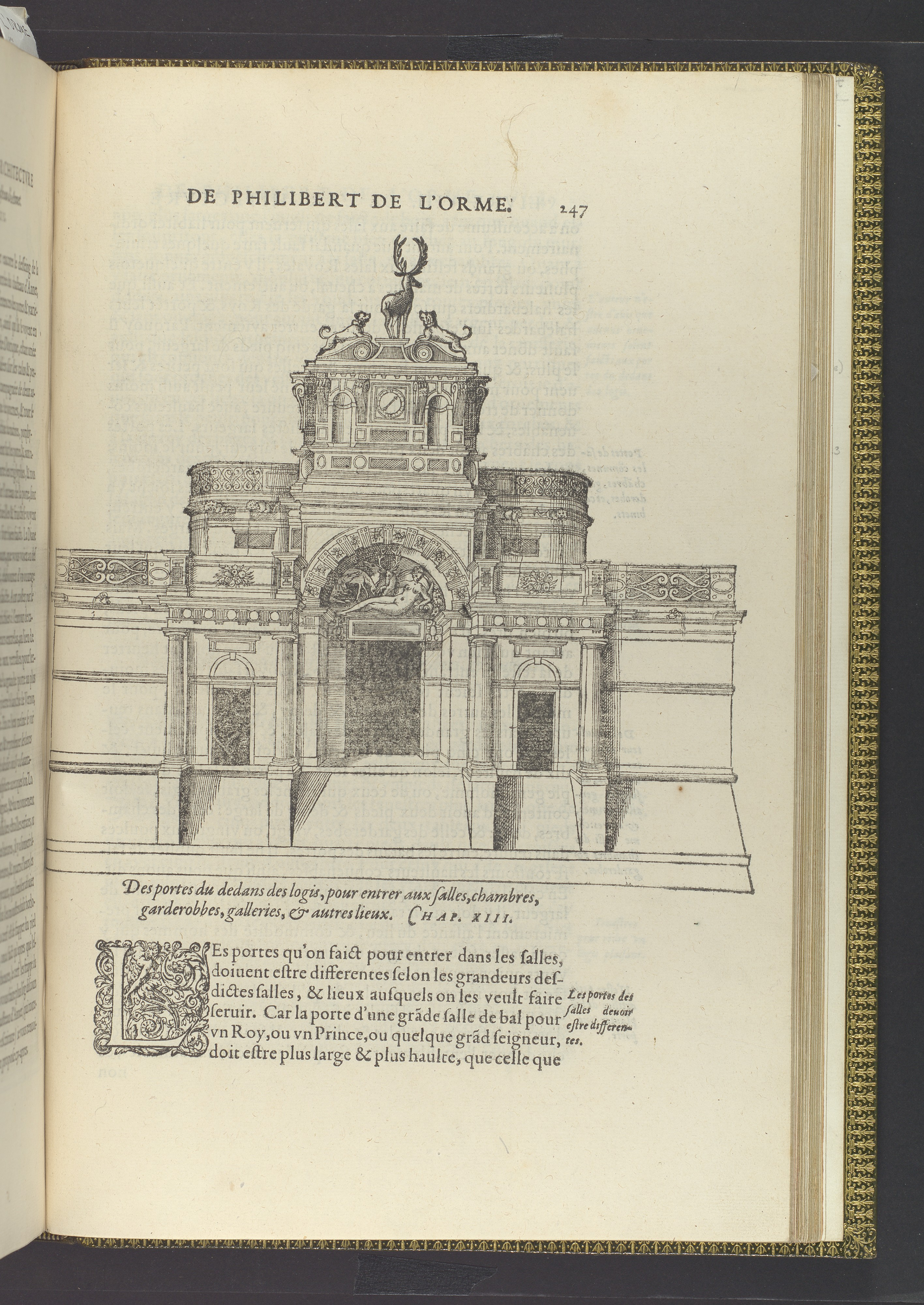
Design for the entrance portal, published in Philibert de L'Orme's Le Premier Tome de l'Architecture (1567)

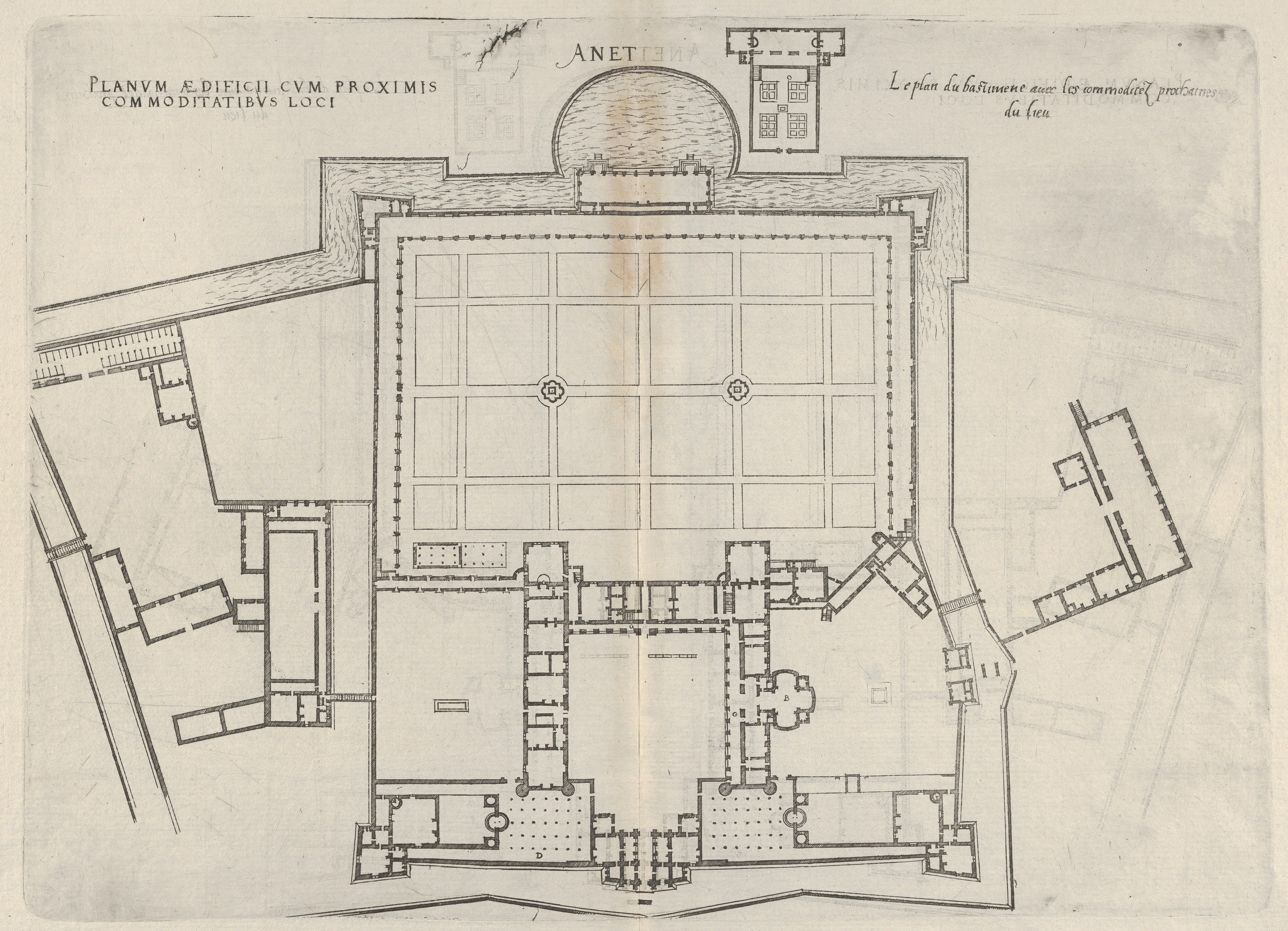
Site plan, engraved by Jacques Androuet du Cerceau for his second volume of Les Plus Excellents Bastiments de France (1579)

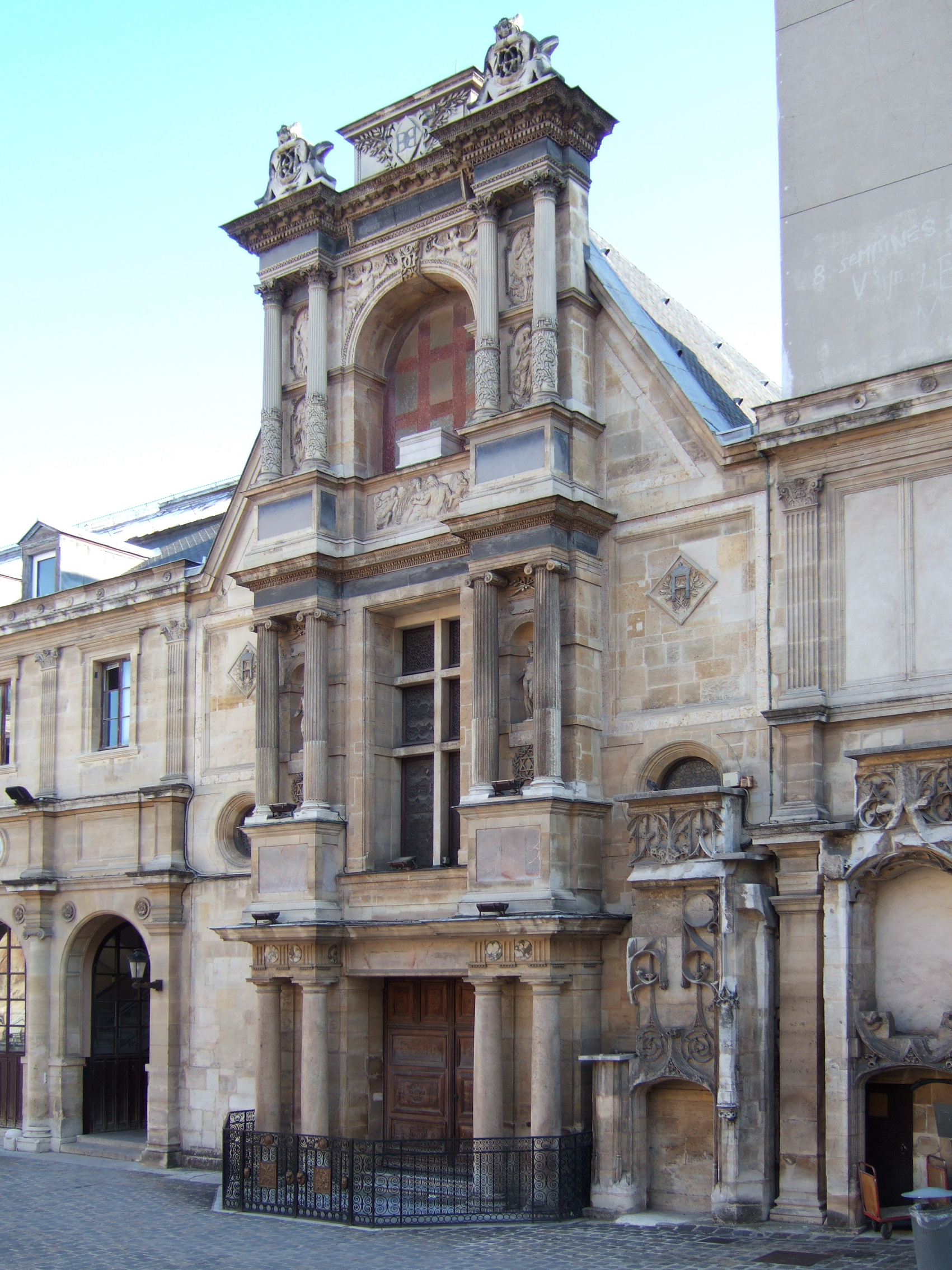
Frontispiece for the corps-de-logis, now at the École des Beaux-Arts in Paris
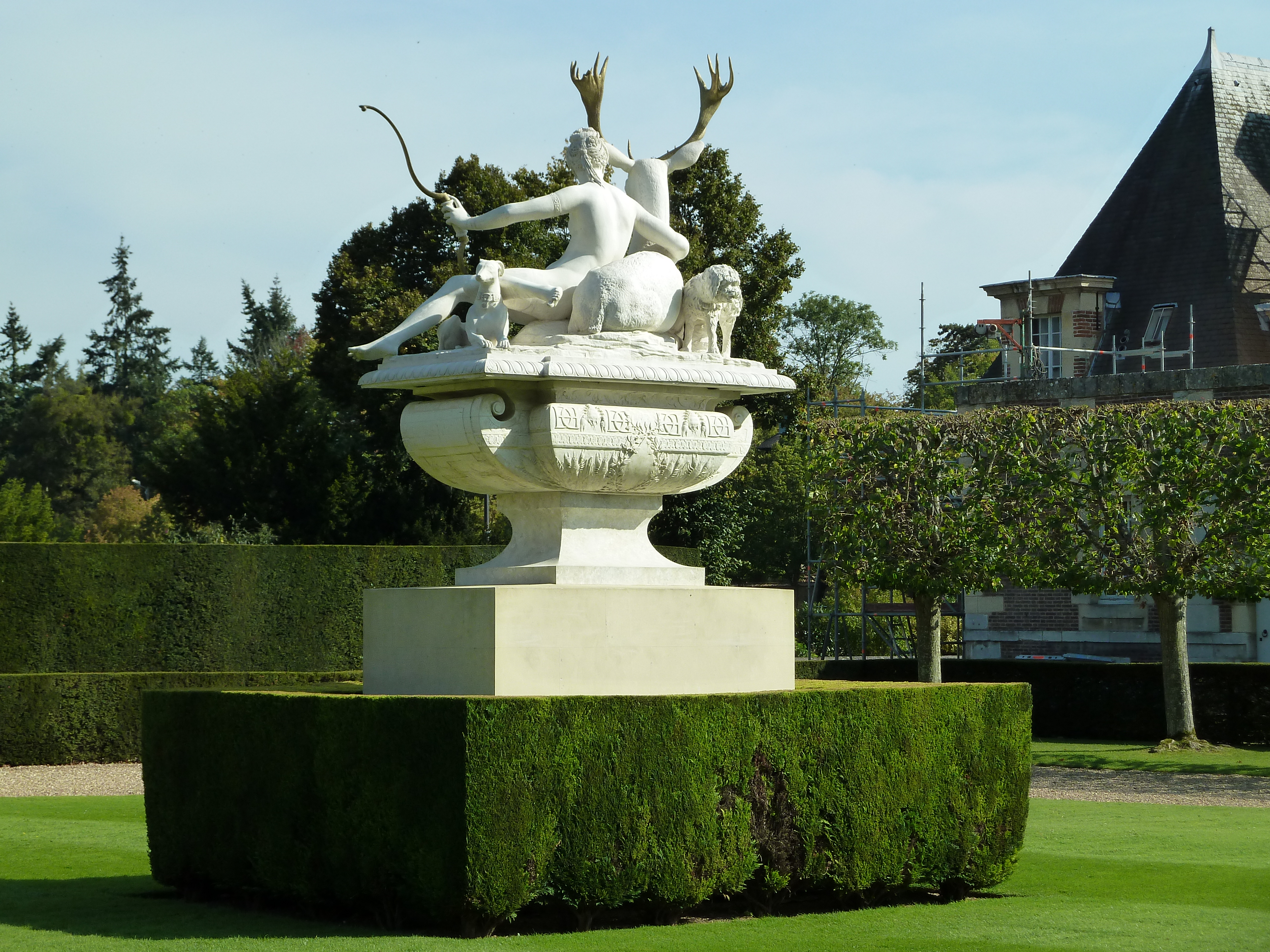
Replica of the Fountain of Diana at Anet

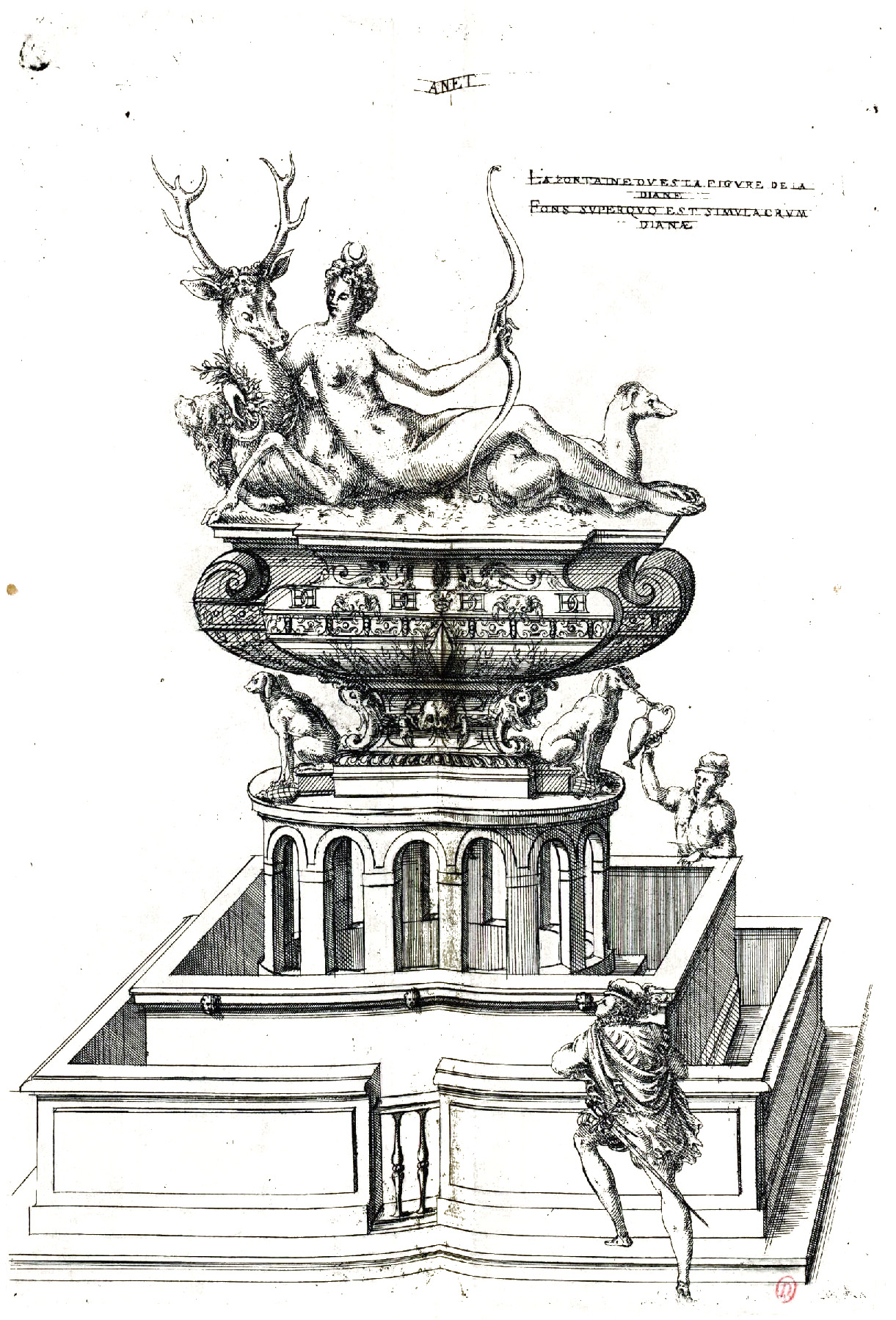
Fountain of Diana, engraved by Jacques Androuet du Cerceau (1579)

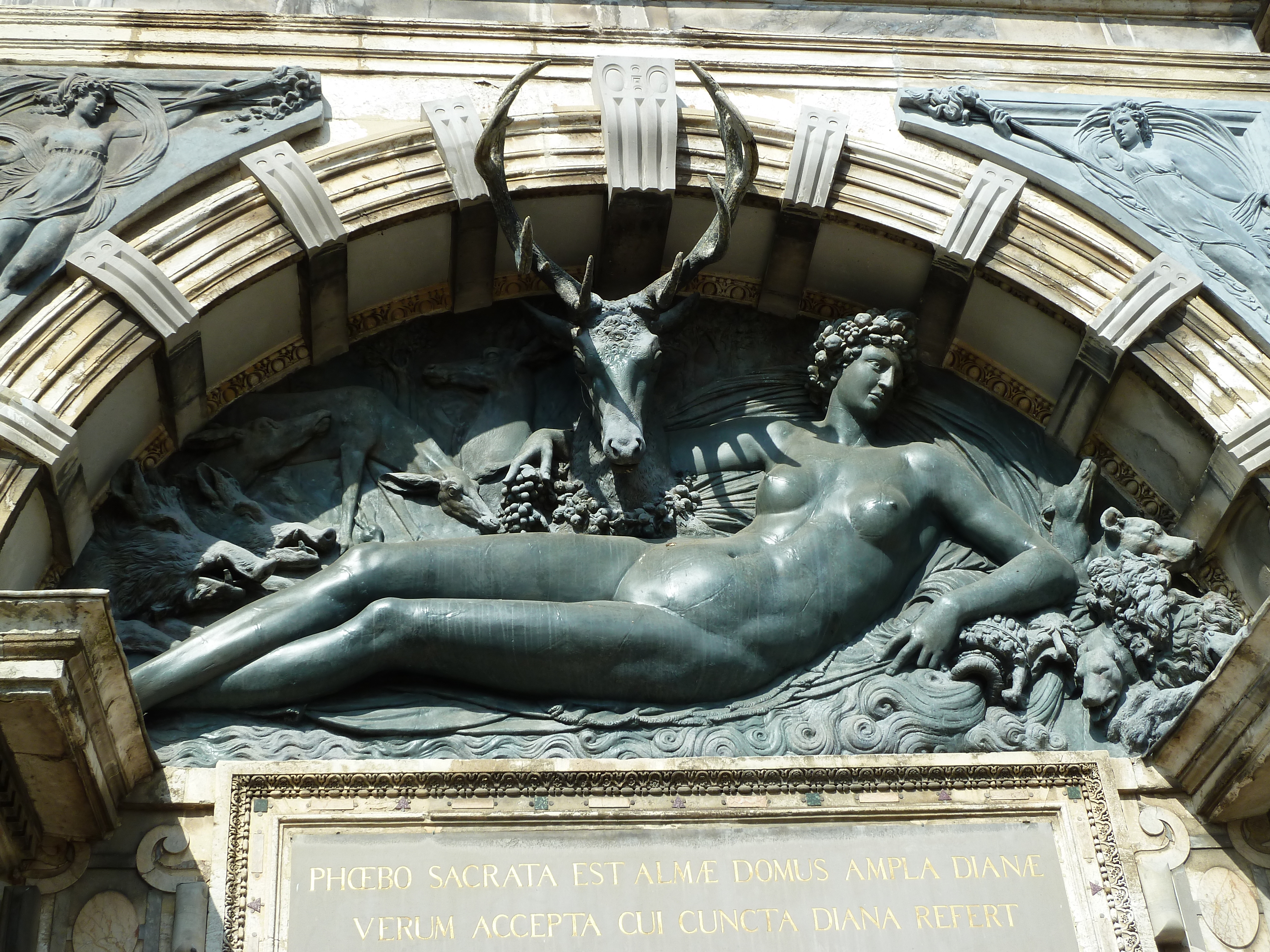
Replica of Benvenuto Cellini's relief, the Nymph of Anet, located over the portal

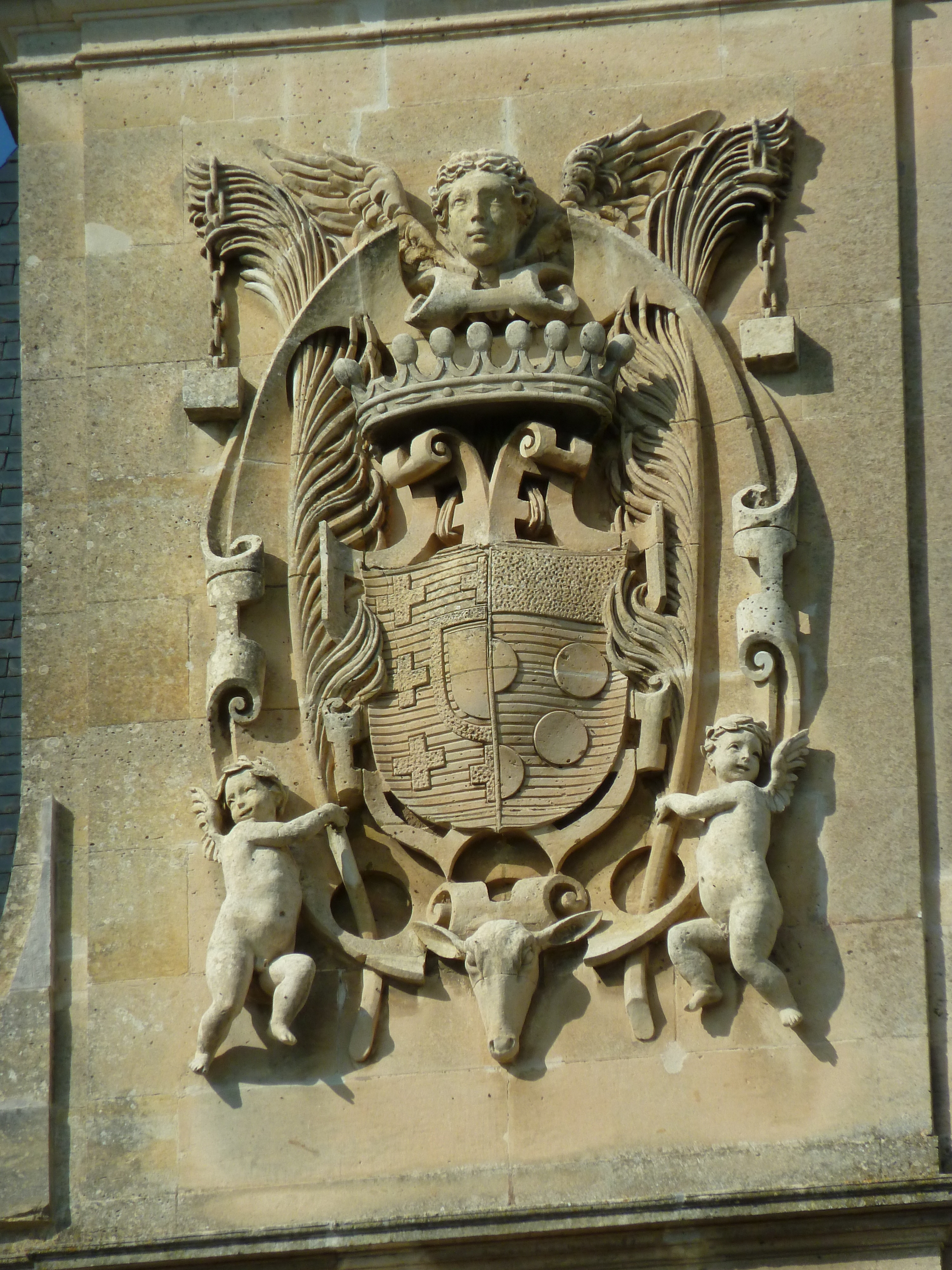
Coat of arms

=== Chapel ===
The now free-standing chapel of Anet was built in 1549-1552 as an appendage on the east side of the east wing of the cour d'honneur. It was designed on a centralized Greek cross floor plan under a diagonally-coffered dome. The original entrance was on the courtyard façade of the east wing, which was subsequently demolished. It has a porch with widely spaced paired Ionic columns between towers crowned by pyramidal spires. The stained-glass windows were made around 1904 by Charles Lorin from Chartres.

Photos of the chapel as it exists today

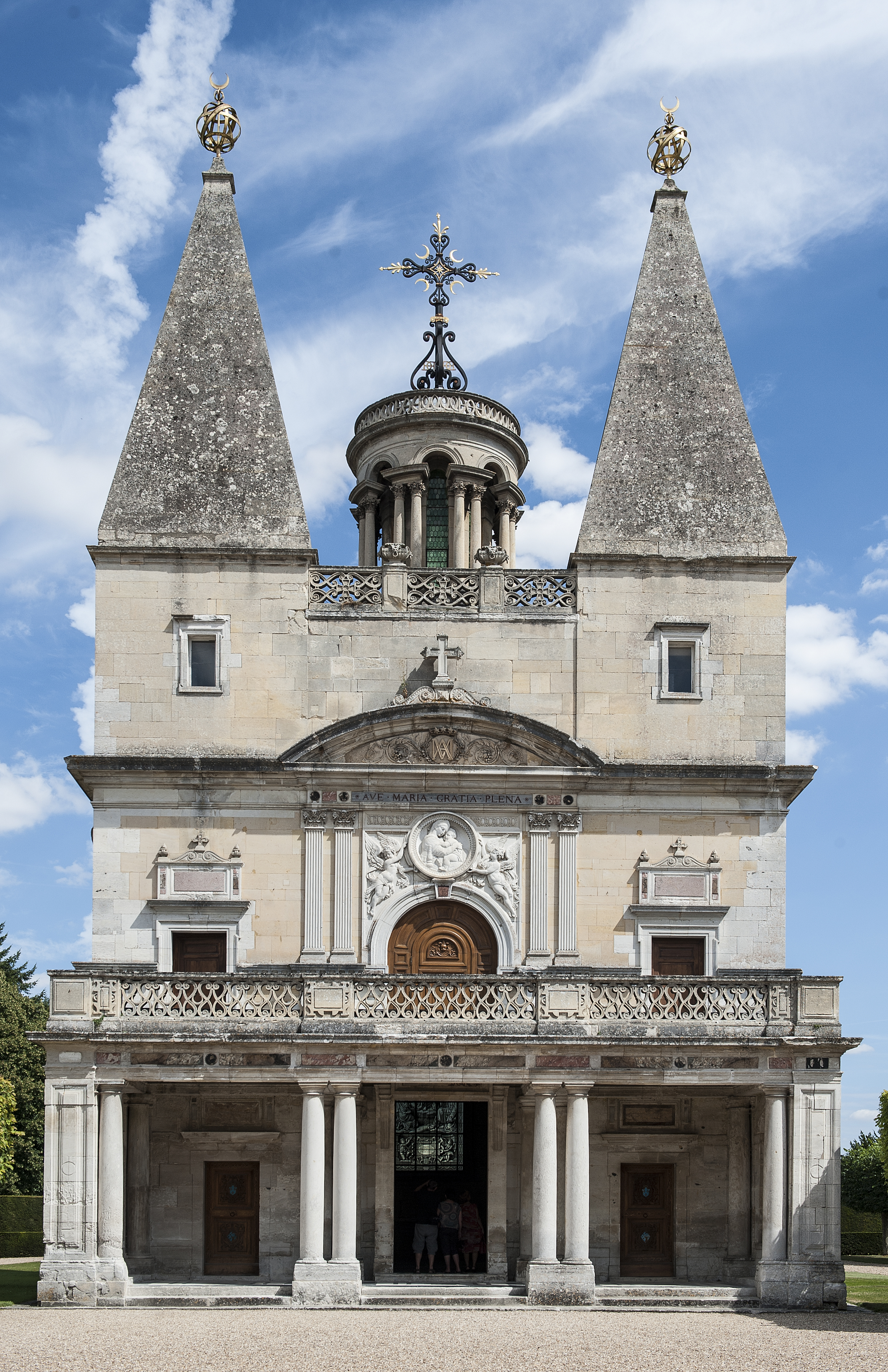
Chapel entrance façade

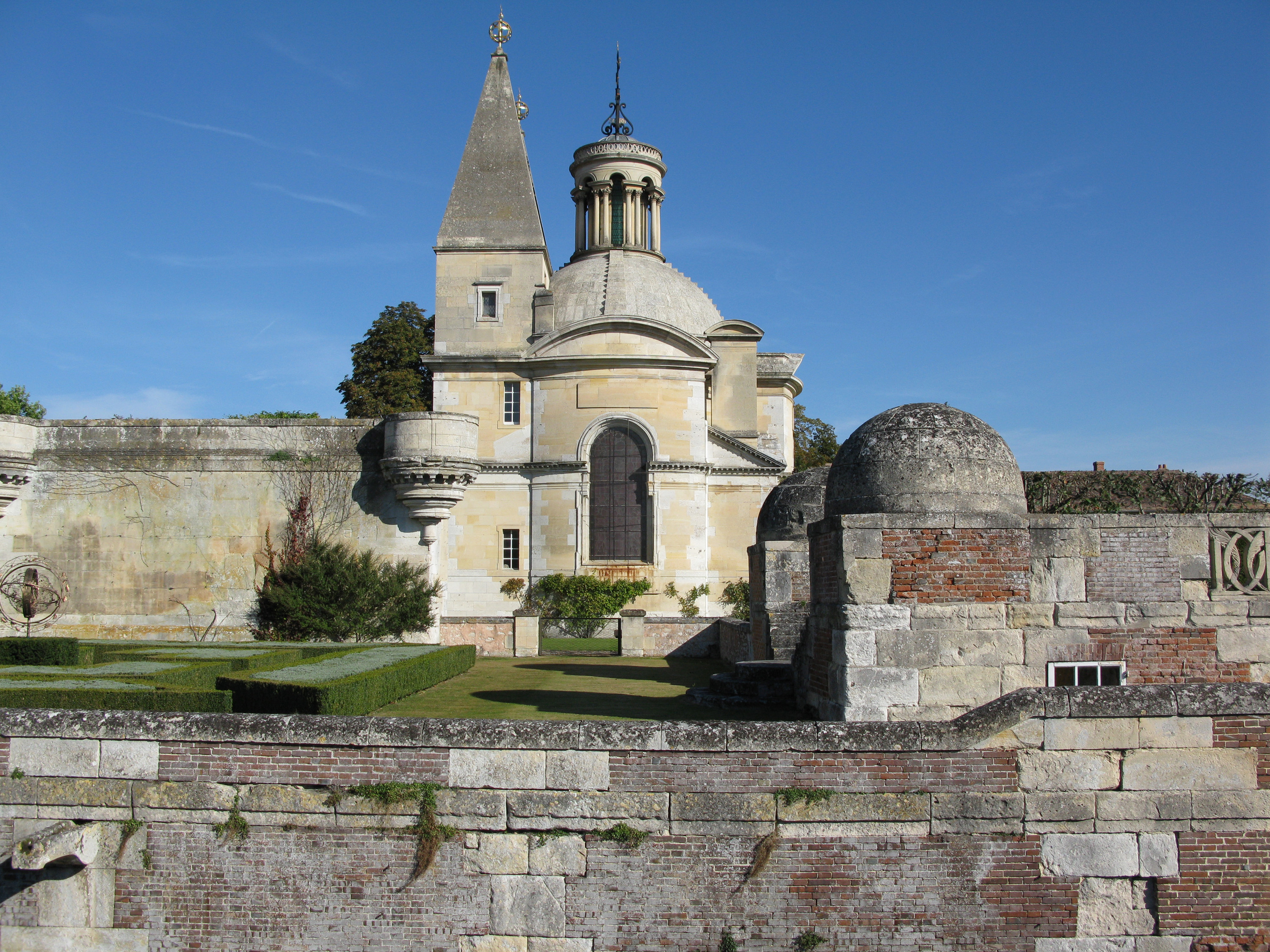
Side-view of the chapel

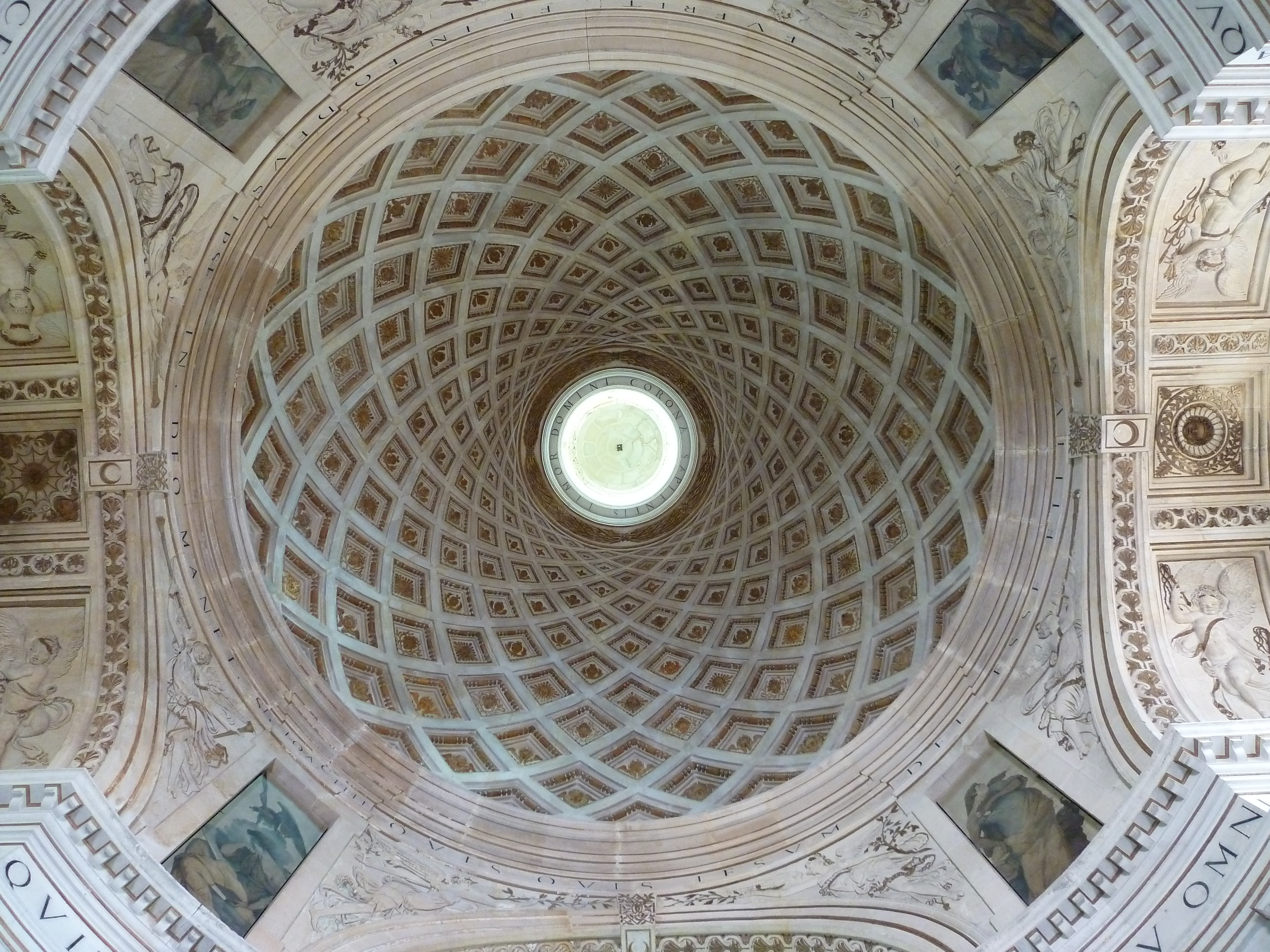
The chapel's spiral-coffered dome, designed by Philibert de L'Orme

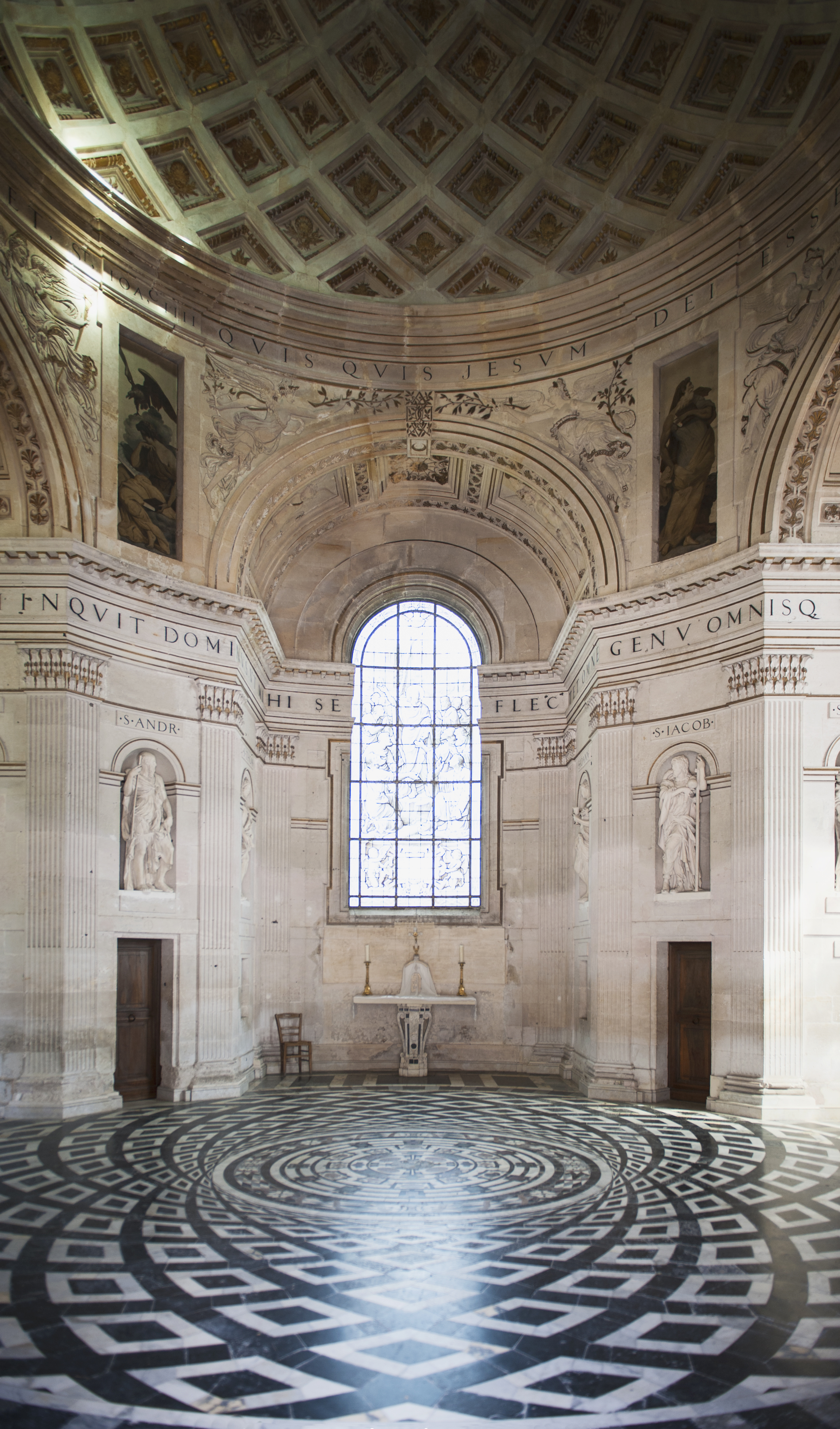
Interior of chapel

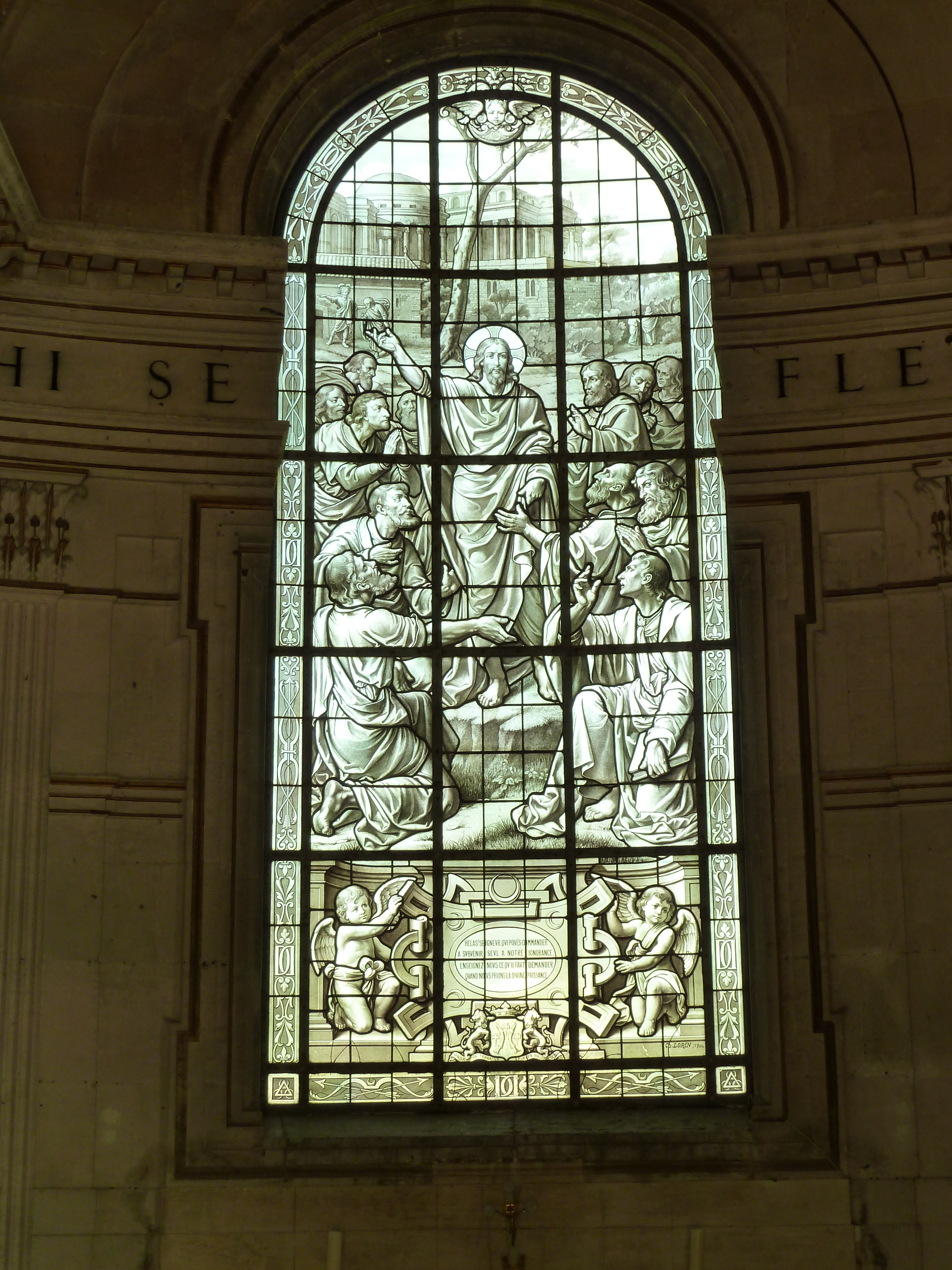
Stained-glass window by Charles Lorin

=== Mortuary chapel ===
There is also the mortuary chapel, built according to Diane de Poitiers' last wishes to contain her tomb, commissioned from Claude de Foucques by Diane's daughter, the Duchesse d'Aumale. In 1581, Henri III and his mother Catherine de' Medici came to the chapel to attend the baptism of the infant son of Charles, duc d'Aumale.

Designs for the mortuary chapel published by Jacques Androuet du Cerceau in 1579

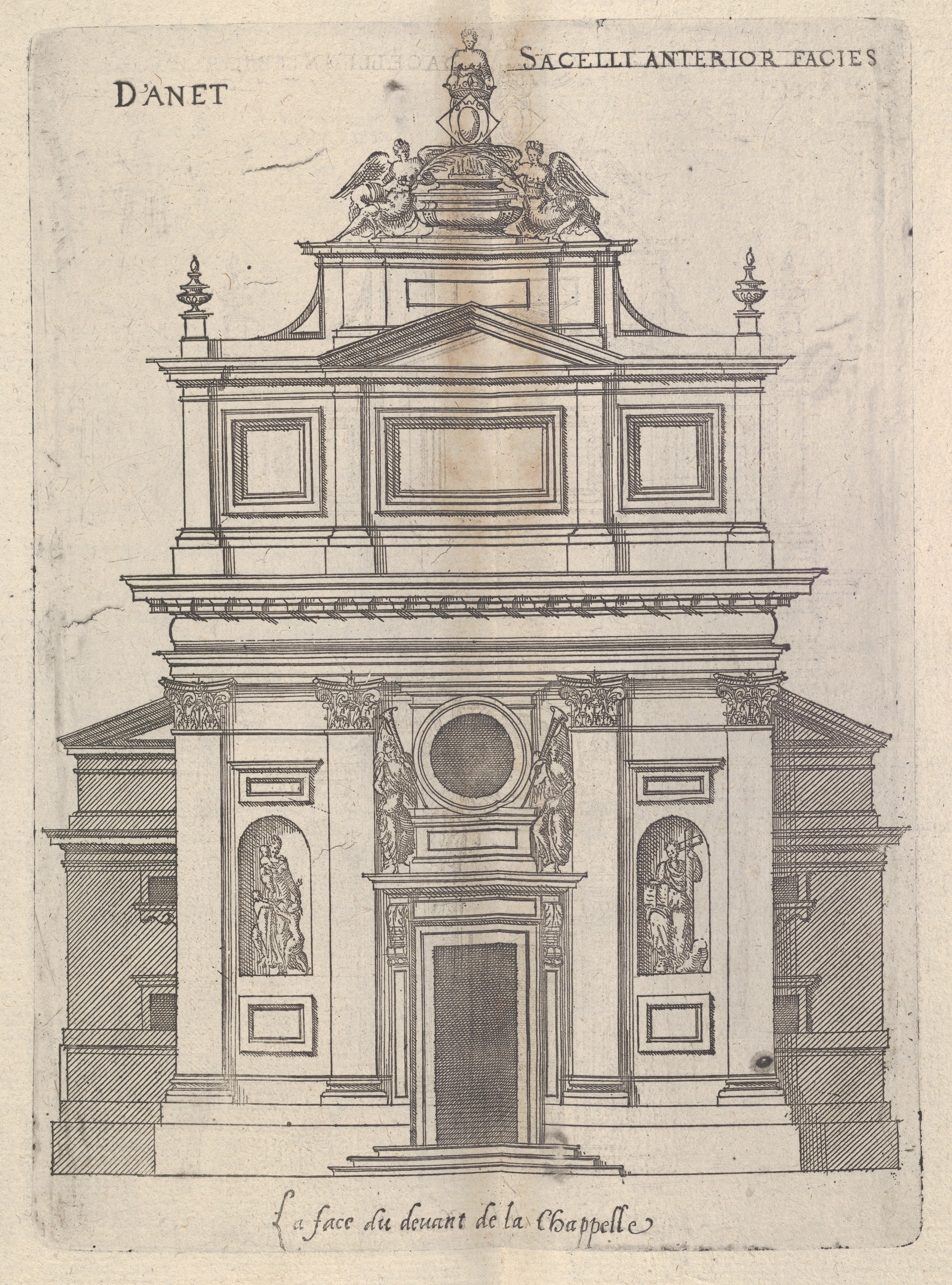
Chapel entrance façade

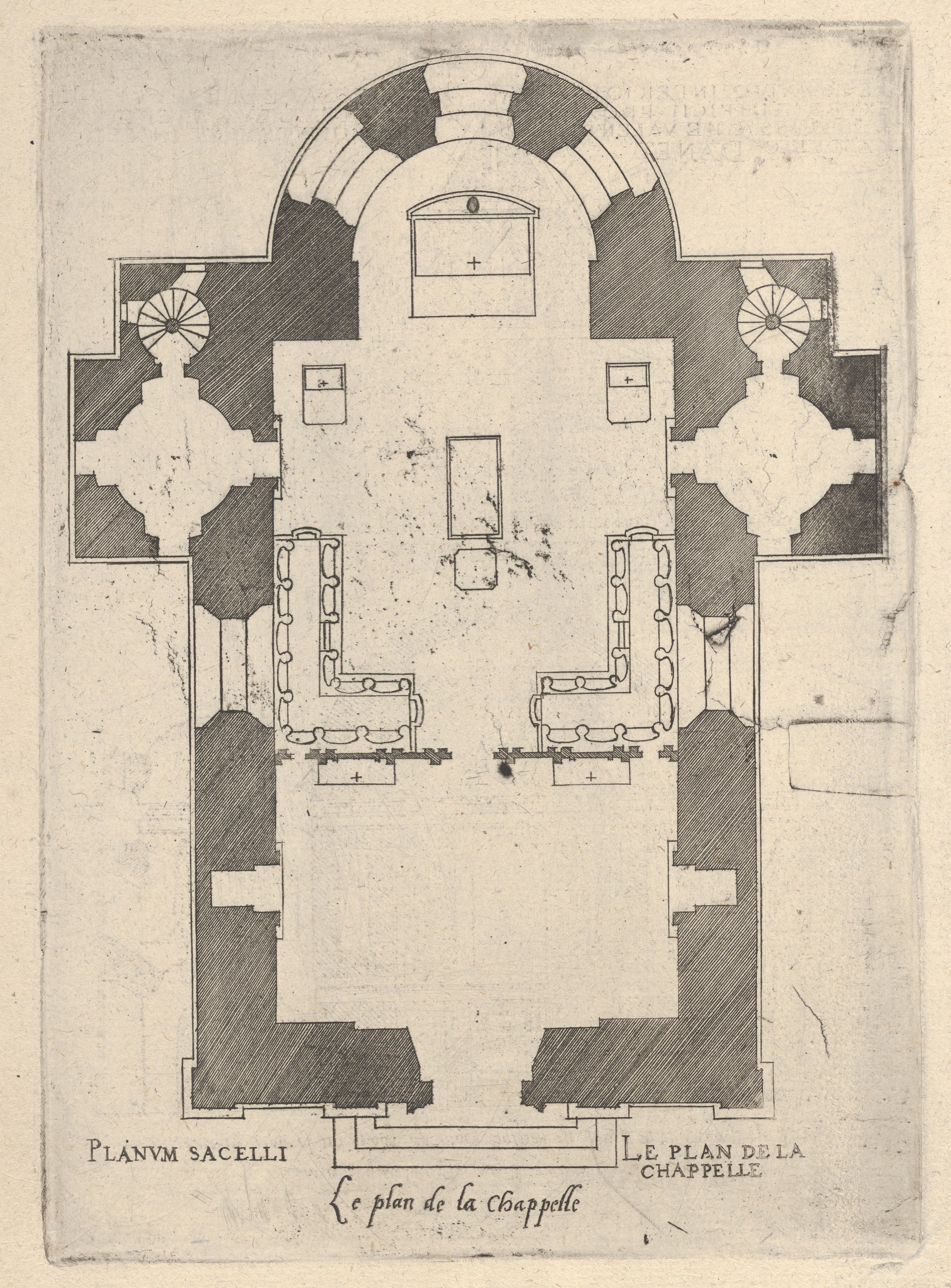
Floor plan

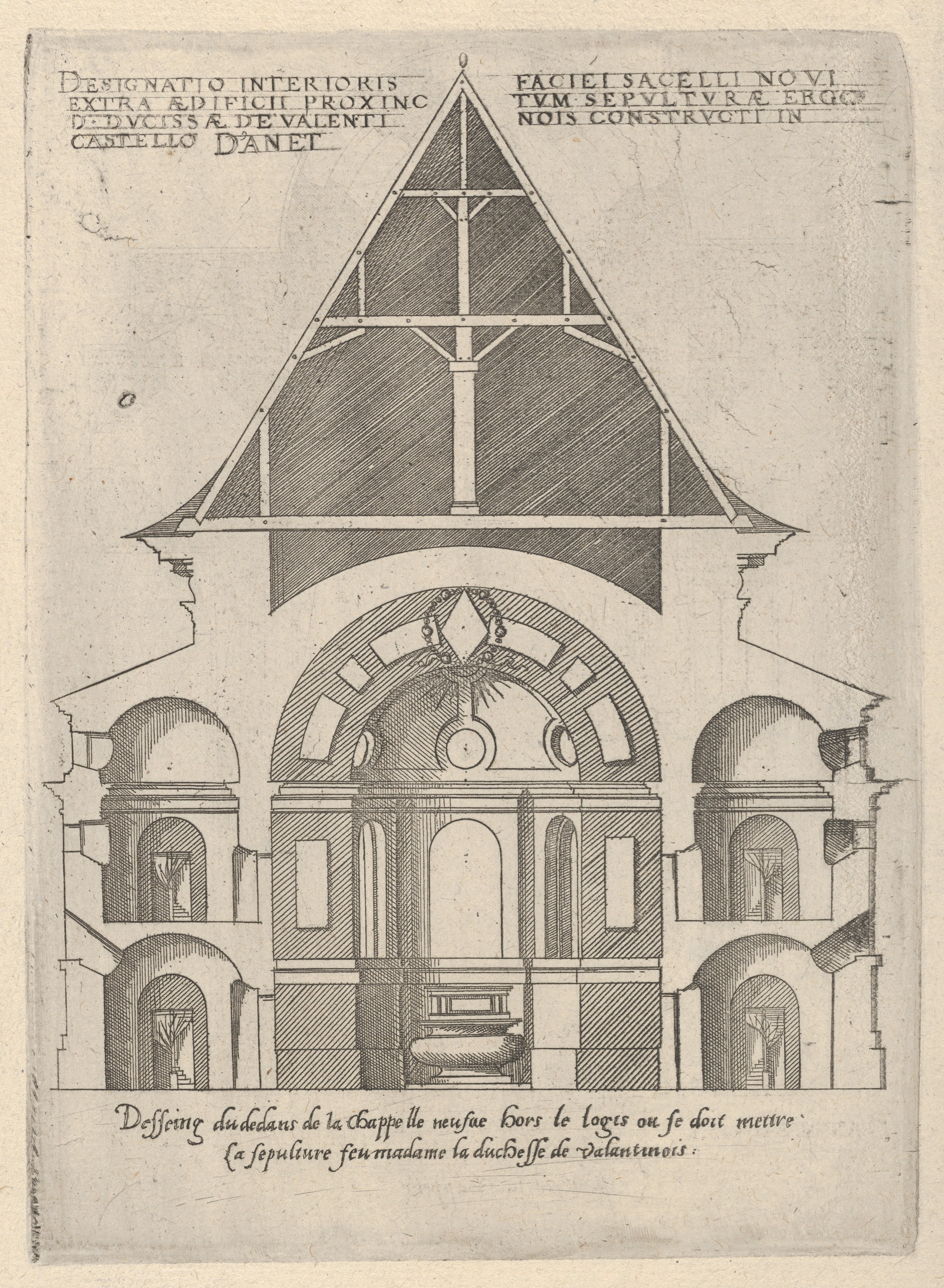
Transverse section
Photos of the mortuary chapel ( 48.858326°N 1.437370°E )

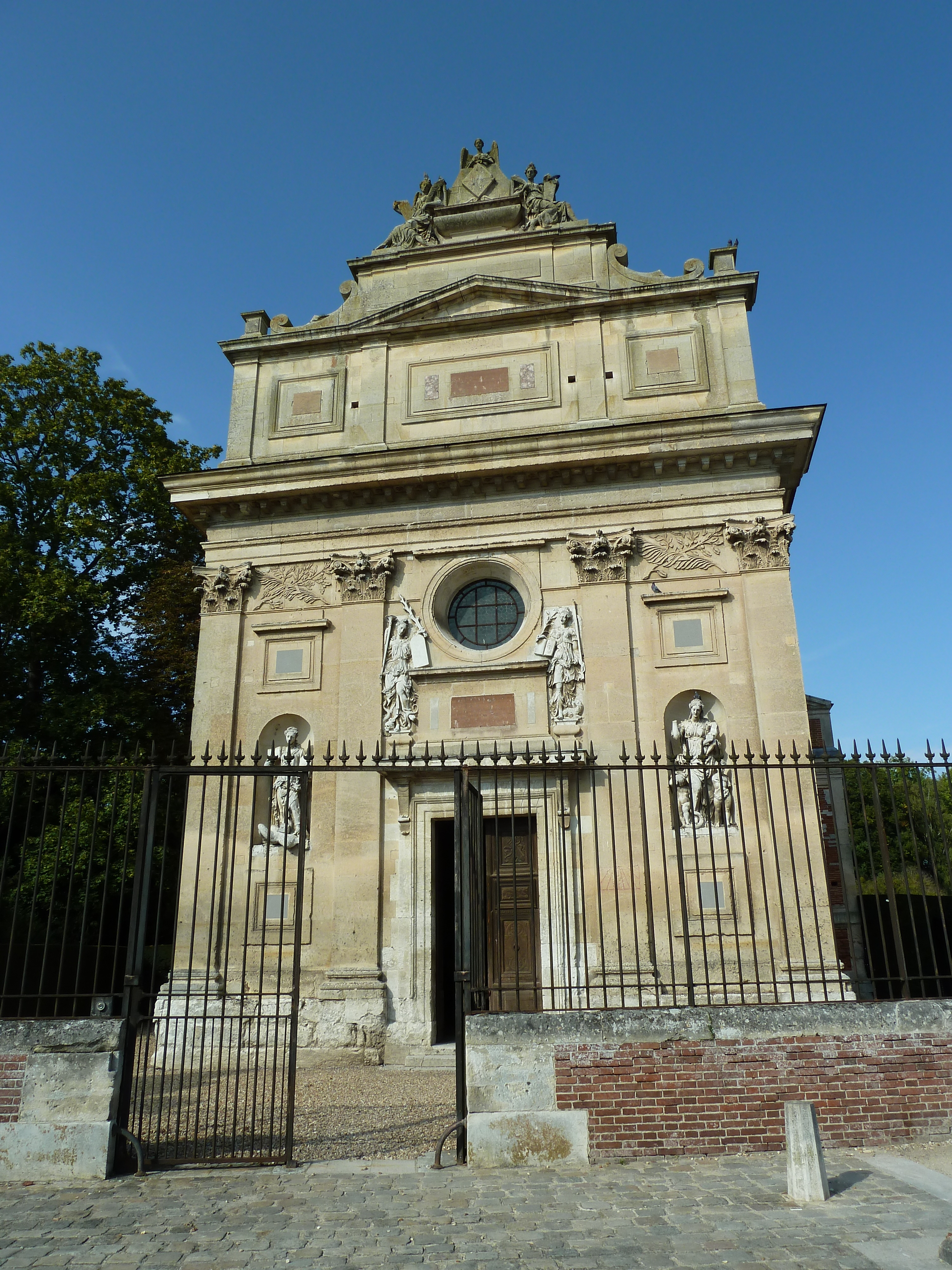
Entrance façade

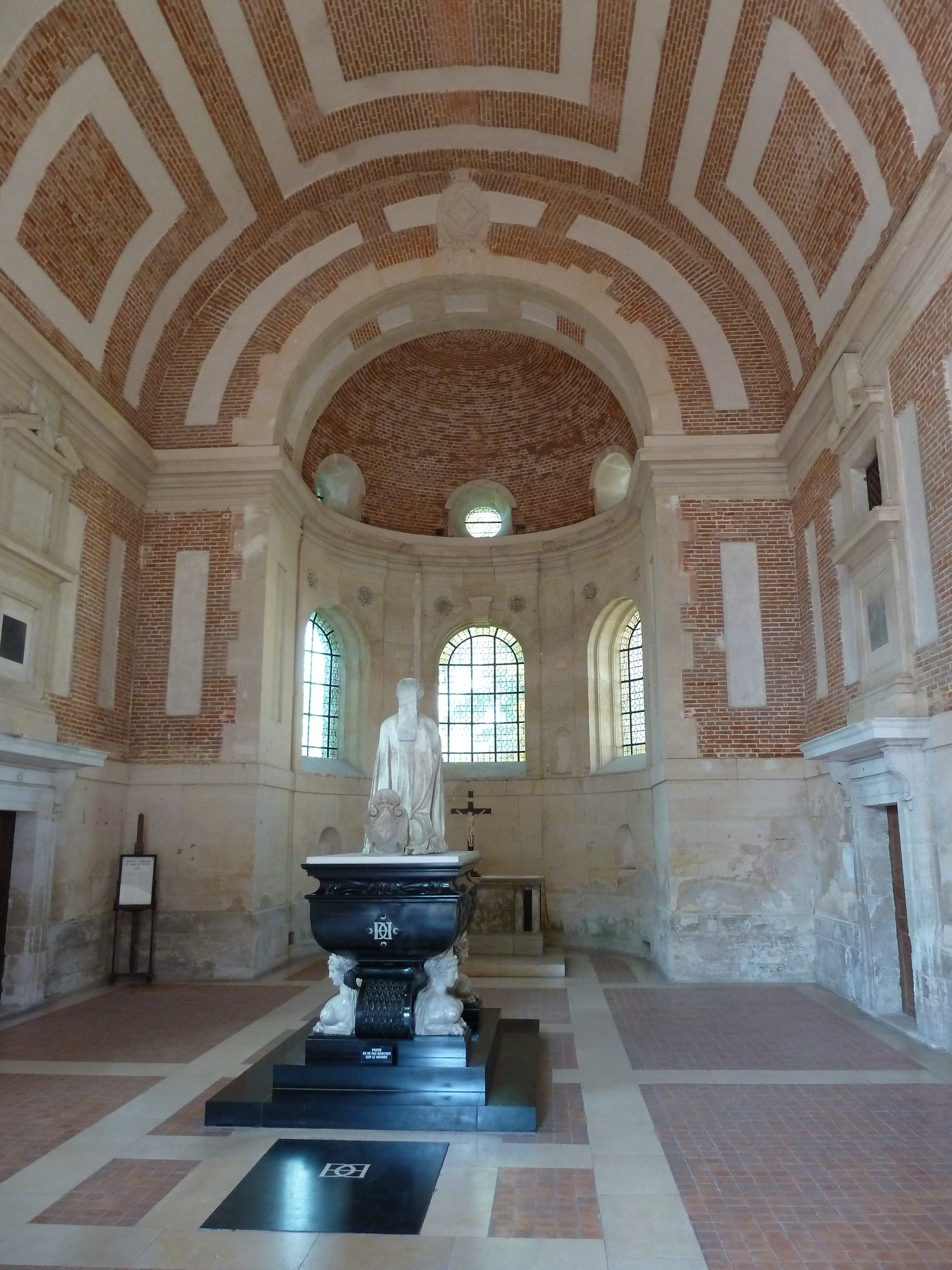
Interior view to the north

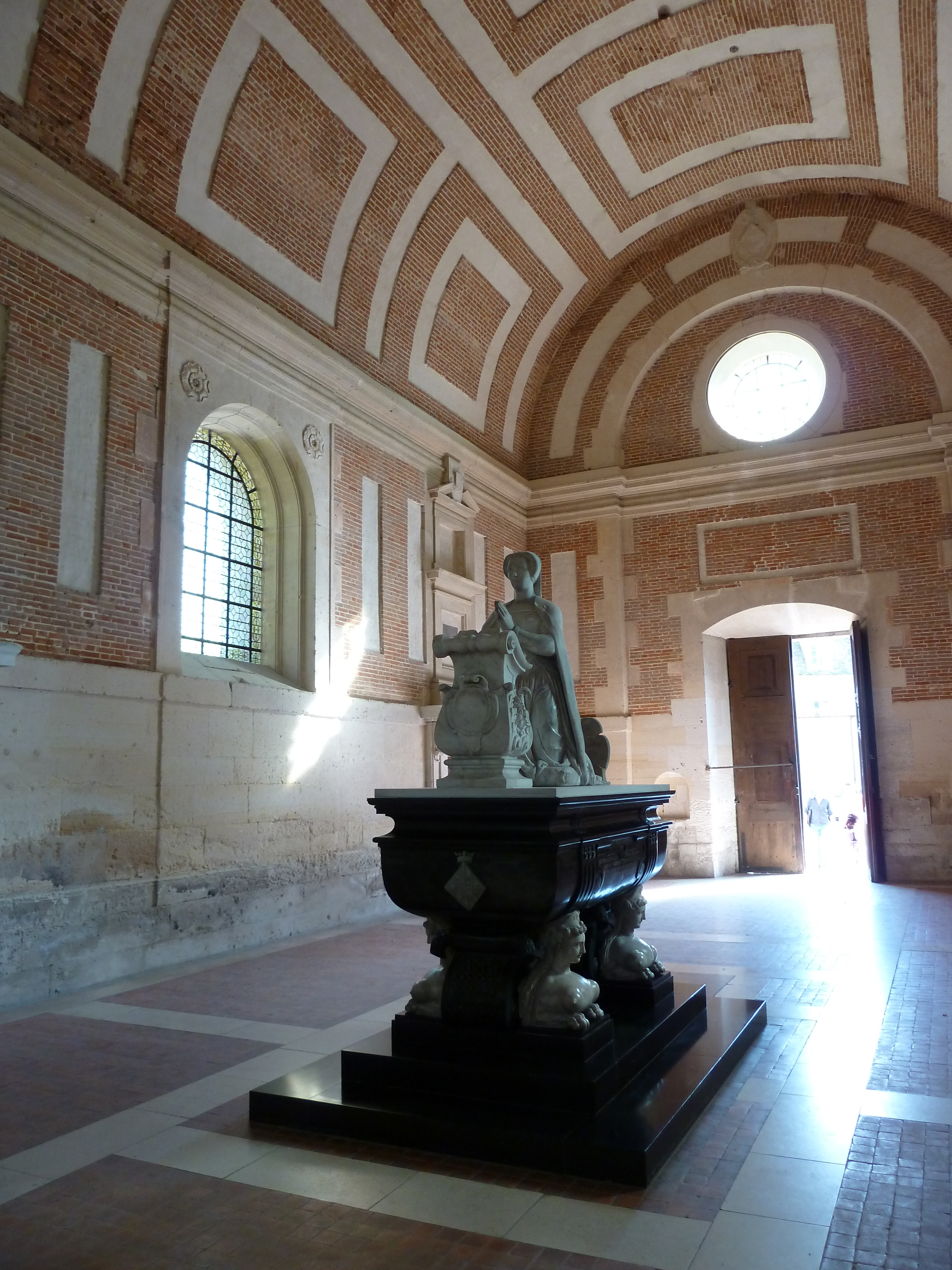
interior view to the south

=== Subsequent history ===
In 1576, Diane's daughter Louise de Brézé transferred ownership of the château to her son Charles, Duke of Aumale. Charles constructed a convent for the Cordeliers in 1587 at the western edge of the Anet parkland. Some years later, Charles was implicated in a conspiracy against Henry IV; he fled into exile in 1595. In his absence, the Parlement of Paris condemned him to death and confiscated all his property. It declared that the Château d'Anet be demolished and the forests of the estate felled. However, Henry IV intervened and saved the château from destruction. In 1610, the Duke was bankrupted by his heavy debts and one of his creditors, Marie of Luxembourg, Duchess of Penthièvre, laid claim to the château. Her ownership was confirmed by the Parlement in 1615. The property's ownership then passed to Marie's daughter Françoise de Lorraine and her husband César de Vendôme, an illegitimate son of Henry IV.

The property was owned, or at least occupied, by Louis Joseph, Duke of Vendôme. Louis Joseph was very fond of the château, entertaining his friends there in luxury. Guests included the poets Guillaume Amfrye de Chaulieu and Chapelle. Vendôme undertook major alterations which removed many original features and decoration from the Renaissance. Only the bedchamber of Diane was spared from the redecoration of the apartments. A third story was added to the corps de logis to increase the accommodation and the wing on the left-hand side was rebuilt. The gardens, which had fallen into neglect over the years, were destroyed, and the redesign of the parkland entrusted to André Le Nôtre. The galleries and bath building surrounding the old gardens were demolished; so too were the orangerie, aviary, and heronry. The stables and Hôtel-Dieu were also demolished and rebuilt in new locations, to make way for intersecting canals. The canals fed two windmills, one of which was built on the site of the old Hôtel-Dieu. One of the canals was dedicated to carp and divided into two compartments by a wall of water lilies.

In 1686, the Grand Dauphin visited Anet for 8 days, where he was sumptuously entertained by Louis-Joseph. The festivities cost the Duke of Vendôme more than 100,000 livres, so much money that Louis XIV would only consent to his son returning for another visit on the condition that the expenses be paid by himself.

The property later belonged to many of Louis XIV's descendants: Louise-Françoise de Bourbon died here in 1743, she was a daughter of the famous illegitimate son of Louis XIV, the Duc du Maine. His sons the prince des Dombes and comte d'Eu lived here when away from Versailles. It was later owned by the fabulously wealthy duc de Penthièvre, first cousin of the prince and the comte.

The château wasn't pillaged during the French Revolution, but Diane de Poitiers' remains were removed to a pauper's ditch in the parish cemetery and the rich contents of the château, which were the property of King Louis XVI's cousin, Louis Jean Marie de Bourbon, duc de Penthièvre, were sold at auction as biens nationaux. A large part of the château was subsequently demolished, but only after Alexandre Lenoir was able to salvage some architectural elements for his Musée des Monuments Français (presently situated in the École des Beaux-Arts in Paris). The restoration of the château itself, in pitiable condition, was due to comte Adolphe de Caraman, who purchased it in 1840 and undertook a colossal program of restoration. Under financial duress, Caraman sold the château in 1860 to Ferdinand Moreau, who continued the restoration, purchasing furnishings and works of art that were thought to be originally from the château. The set of tapestry hangings woven for the château, in Paris, to cartoons by Jean Cousin, forming a History of Diana in compliment to Diane de Poitiers, is now widely scattered; it set a precedent for suites of Diana-themed tapestries that remained popular into the 18th century. The elements were reinstalled at Anet after World War II.

In 1889, the château is designated by the French government as a protected monument historique (national heritage site).

The castle was used as a filming location in the 1965 James Bond film Thunderball and 1976 film The Pink Panther Strikes Again. The entry pavilion for Chateau d'Anet was the inspiration for the façade of Robert Venturi's 1966 Guild House for the Elderly in Philadelphia.

== Gallery ==
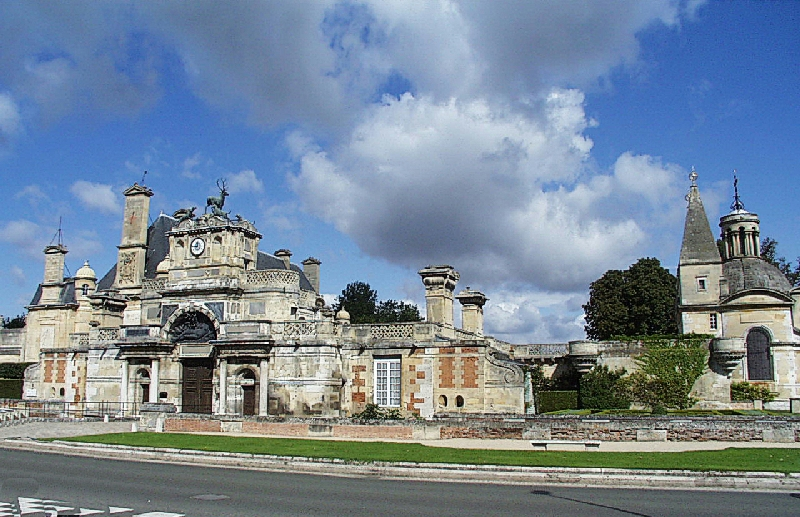
Anet today

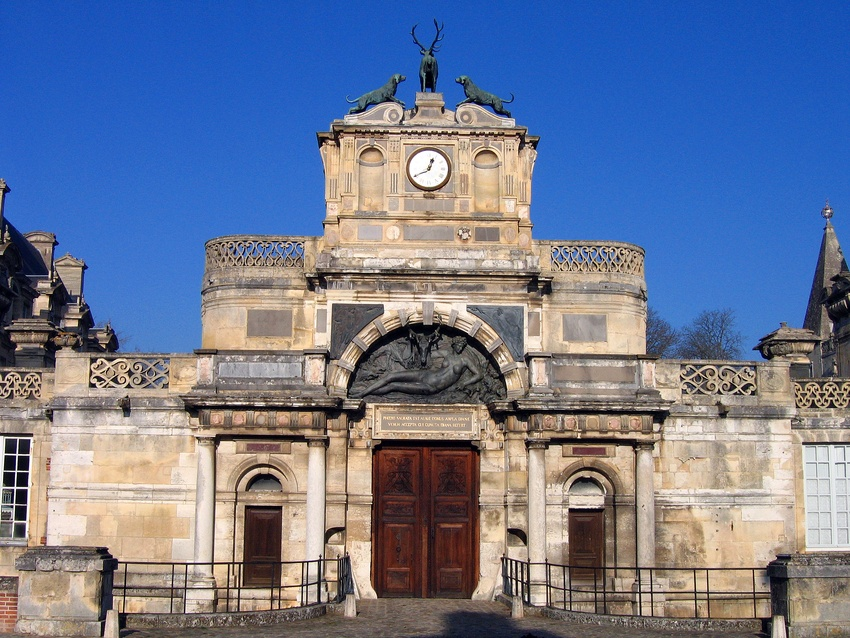
The portal

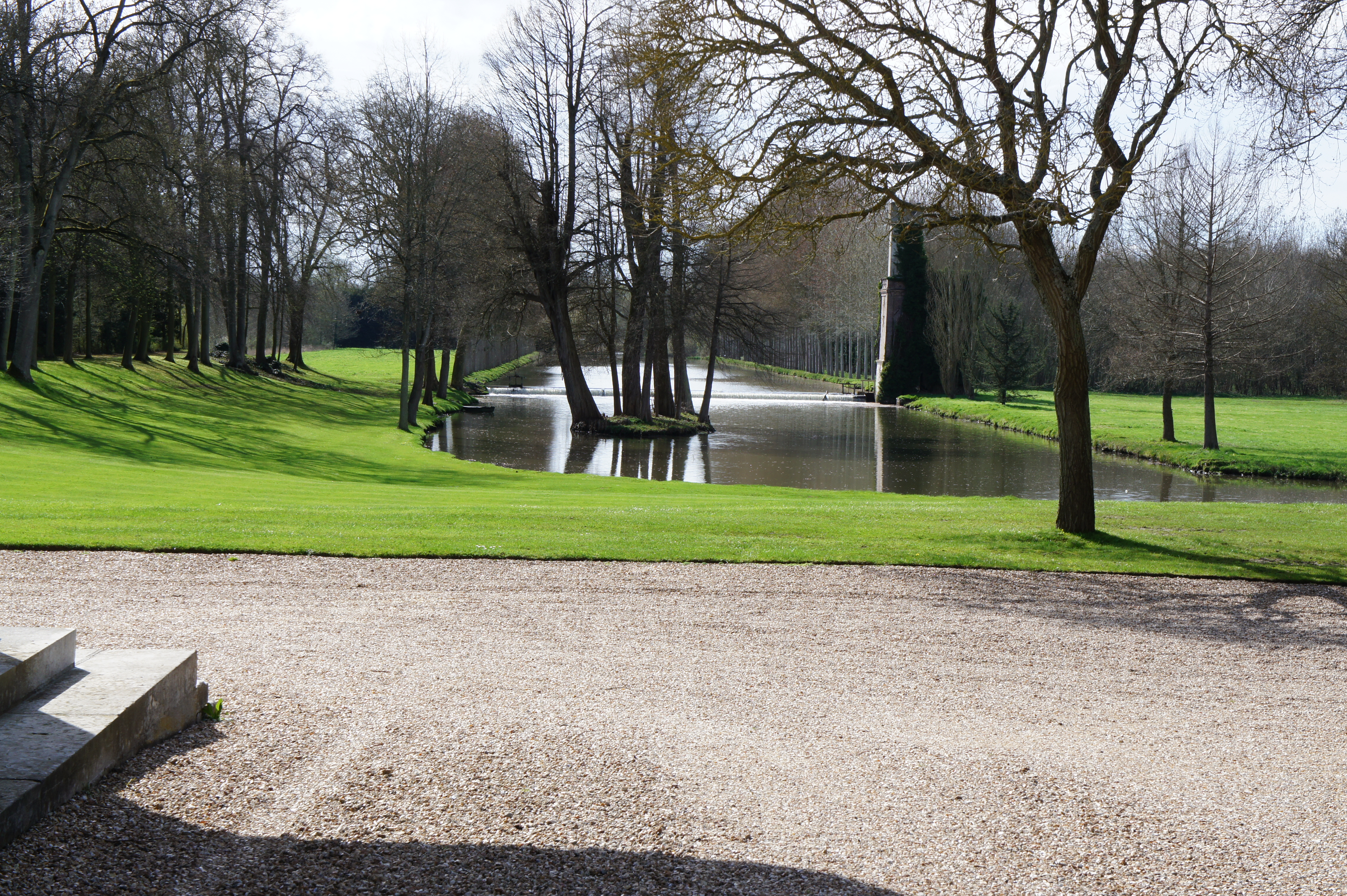
The park

== See also ==
- List of châteaux in Eure-et-Loir
- 16th-century Western domes
