= Fountain of Diana =

French 16th-century marble sculpture

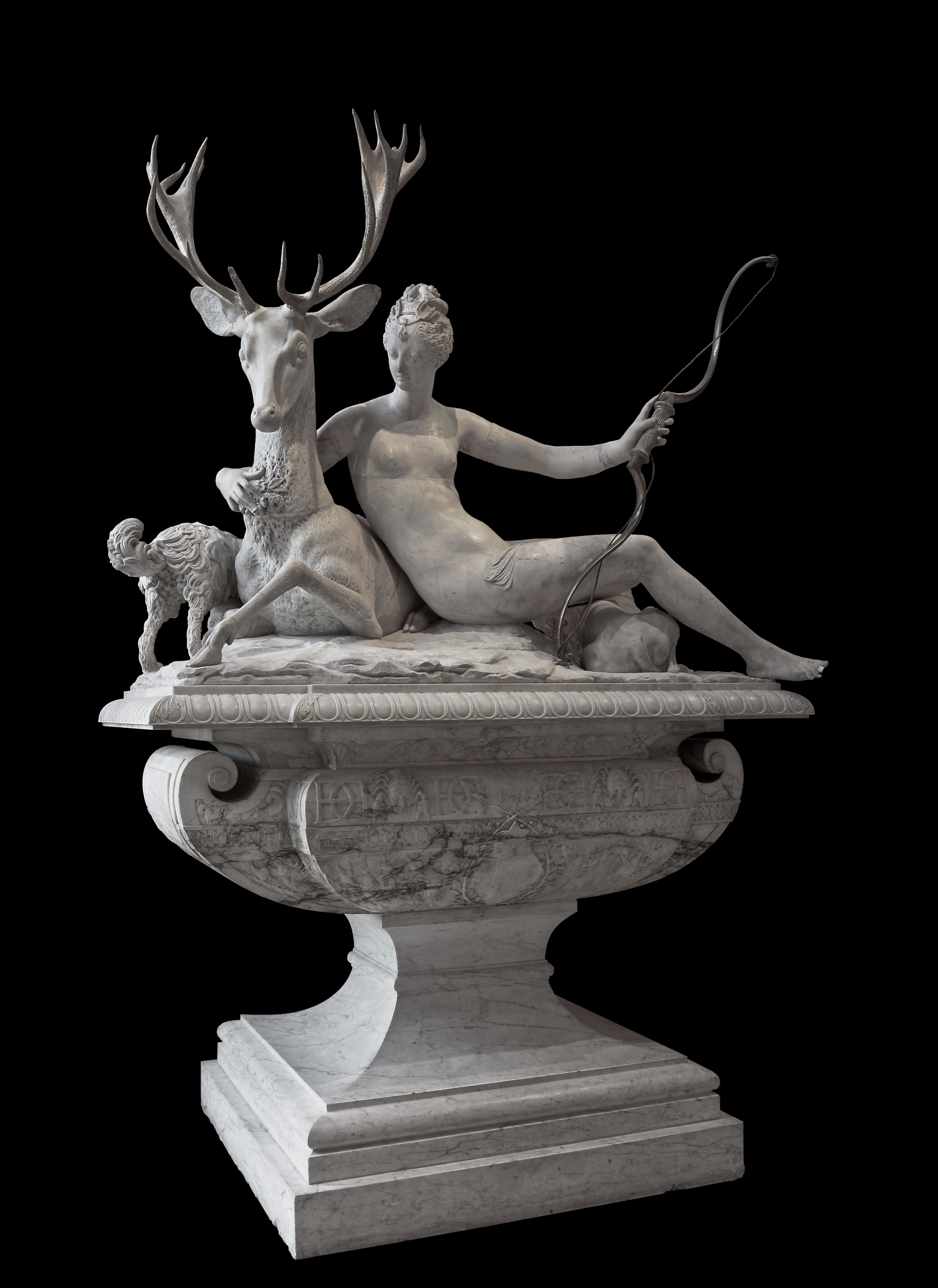
- Artist: Anonymous work
- Year: c. 1549
- Medium: Marble
- Dimensions: 211 cm × 258 cm (83 in × 102 in); 134 cm diameter (53 in)
- Location: Louvre, Paris

The Fountain of Diana (French: Fontaine de Diane), also known as the Diana of Anet (French: Diane d'Anet) and Diana with a Stag (French: Diane au cerf), is a marble Mannerist sculpture of the goddess Diana, representing Diane de Poitiers. It was created c. 1550 to be the central ornament of a grand fountain in a courtyard of Diane de Poitier's Château d'Anet, but today is in the Louvre, Room 214 (formerly 15b) on the ground floor of the Richelieu Wing (Louvre inventory no. MR 1581 MR sup 123); the Louvre has retitled it Diane appuyée sur un cerf ("Diana leaning on a deer"). It was long believed to be the work of Jean Goujon, but the identity of the sculptor is now considered uncertain, although Benvenuto Cellini, Germain Pilon, Pierre Bontemps, and Ponce Jacquiot have in turn been suggested.

== Description ==
Diana, the goddess of hunting, is represented with two dogs (a greyhound named Phrocyon and a barbet dog named Cyrius) and a large stag. This striking ensemble has become one of the most famous works of the French Renaissance. Not a true portrait of Diane de Poitiers, it is but one of the many closely related images of moon goddesses, including the paintings Diana the Huntress by a member of the School of Fontainebleau and Le Bain de Diane by François Clouet.

The sculpture was a part of the fountain in Diane de Poitiers's Château d'Anet built by Philibert de L'Orme from 1547. The ensemble, as engraved in its original location by Jacques Androuet du Cerceau and as shown in a 16th-century drawing at the Louvre, differs from its current form. The stag's head and the dog on the left are positioned quite differently. The sculpture was heavily restored in the 18th century and a second time in 1799–1800 by Pierre-Nicolas Beauvallet. Nevertheless, an early 17th-century drawing by Jacques Gentilhâtre in the Library of the Royal Institute of British Architects shows it much as it appears today. In 1953, the British art historian Anthony Blunt argued that the engraving and the earlier drawing are not independent, and the differences are the result of "the sort of alteration that du Cerceau often made".

The traditional attribution to Jean Goujon, suggested by Alexandre Lenoir in 18th century, is not accepted today. Other sculptors have been suggested, including Benvenuto Cellini, Pierre Bontemps, Ponce Jacquiot and especially Germain Pilon.

Drawings related to the Fountain of Diana

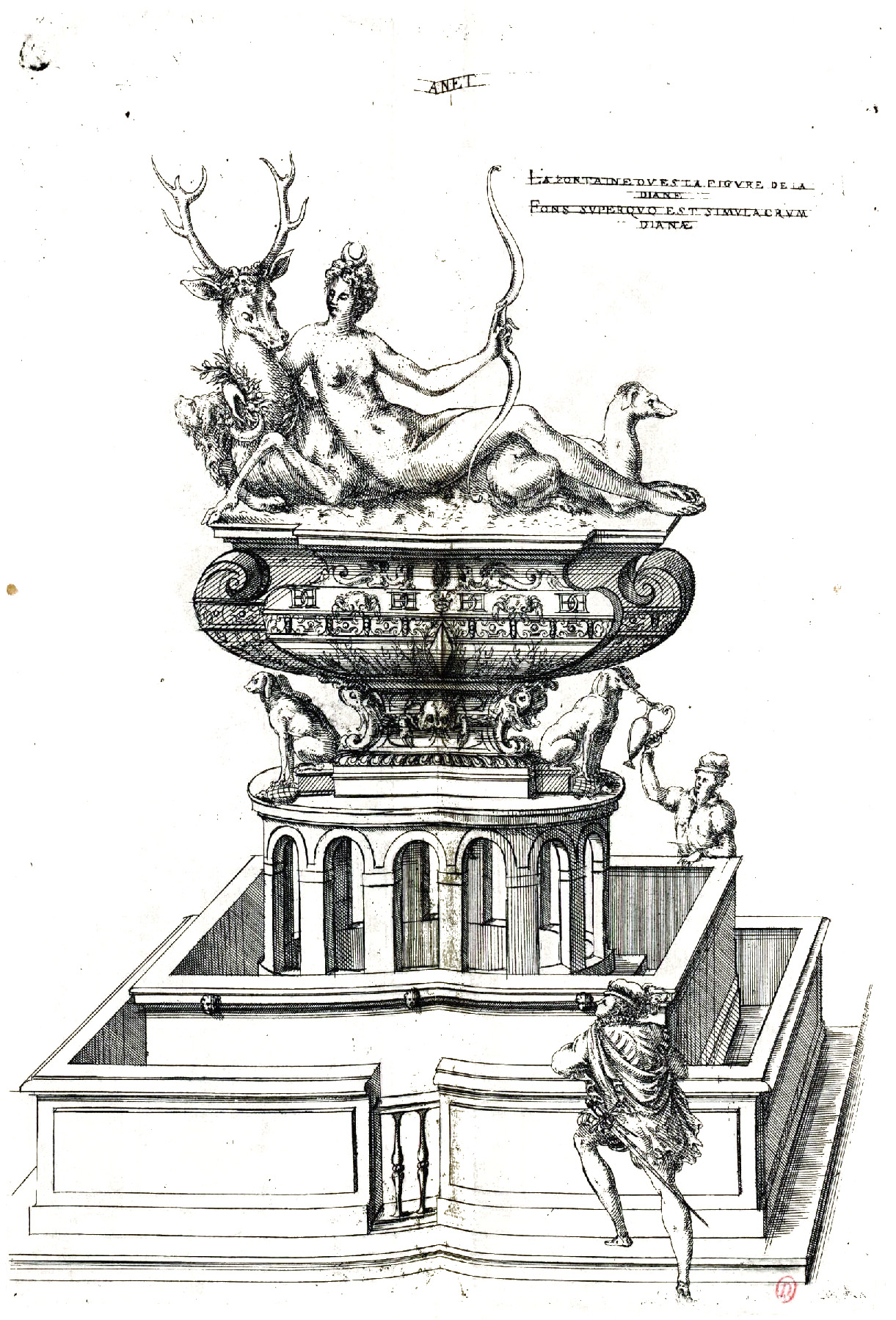
Engraving published by Jacques Androuet du Cerceau in 1579

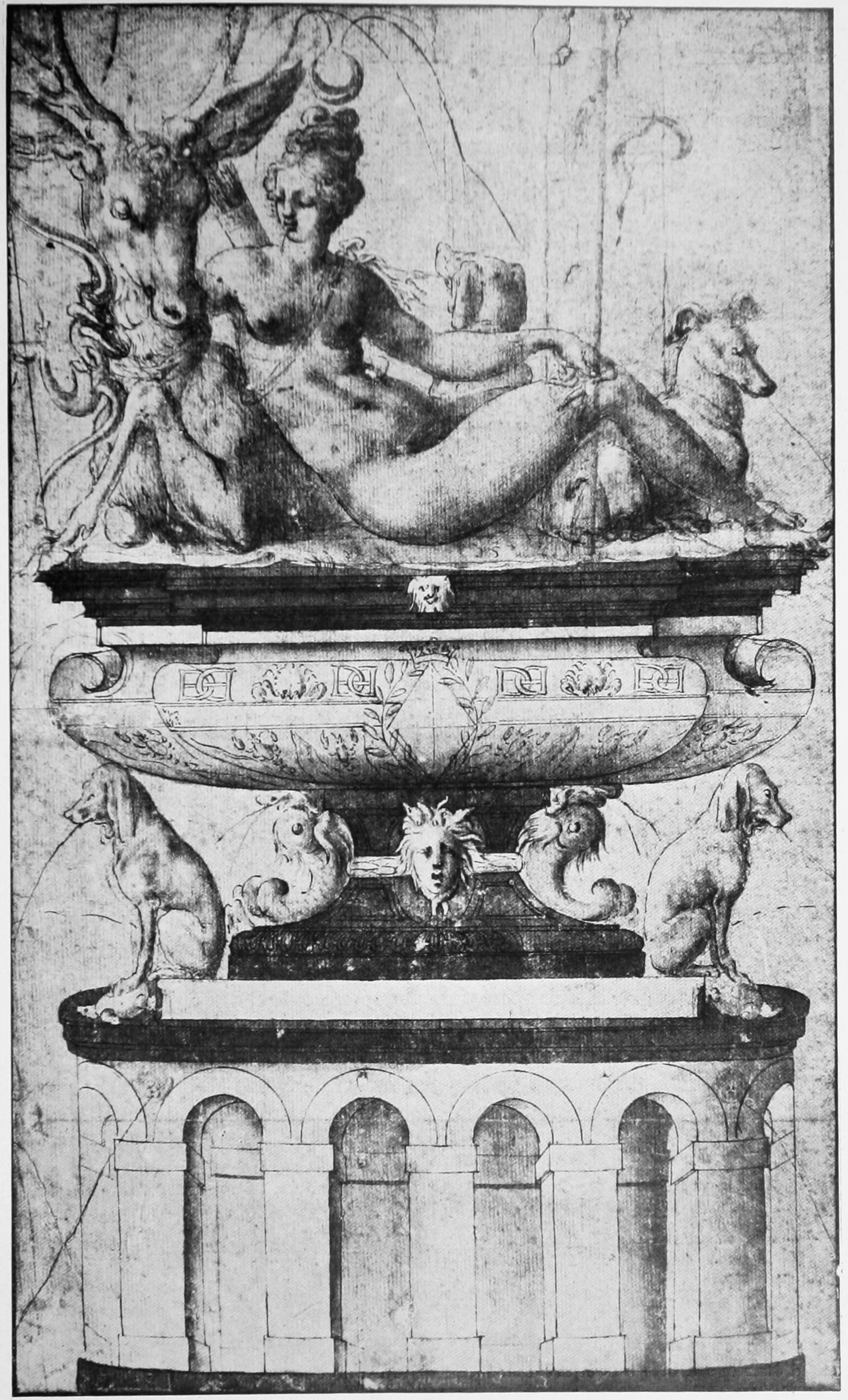
Anonymous work 16th-century drawing (Louvre)

== See also ==
- Nymph of Fontainebleau
- School of Fontainebleau
- Diana of Versailles

== Bibliography ==
- Beaulieu, Michèle, "Description raisonnée des sculptures du Musée du Louvre", vol. 2, Renaissance française, Paris, 1978, pp. 96–99.
- Blunt, Anthony, Art and Architecture in France 1500–1700, London, 1953, p. 70. (French edition, 1983, p. 108.)
- Du Colombier, P., Jean Goujon, Paris, 1949, pp. 130–133.
- Mayer, Marcel, "La fontaine de Diane du château d'Anet n'est pas de Benvenuto Cellini", Revue de l'art ancien et moderne, vol. 68, June 1935, pp. 125–134.
- Ruby, Sigrid, Mit Macht verbunden. Bilder der Favoritin im Frankreich der Renaissance, Heidelberg: arthistoricum.net, 2017 (2010). https://doi.org/10.11588/arthistoricum.315.429
- Zerner, H., L'Art de la Renaissance en France. L'invention du classicisme, Paris, 1996, pp. 361–363.
