= Diana of Versailles =

Statue of Diana

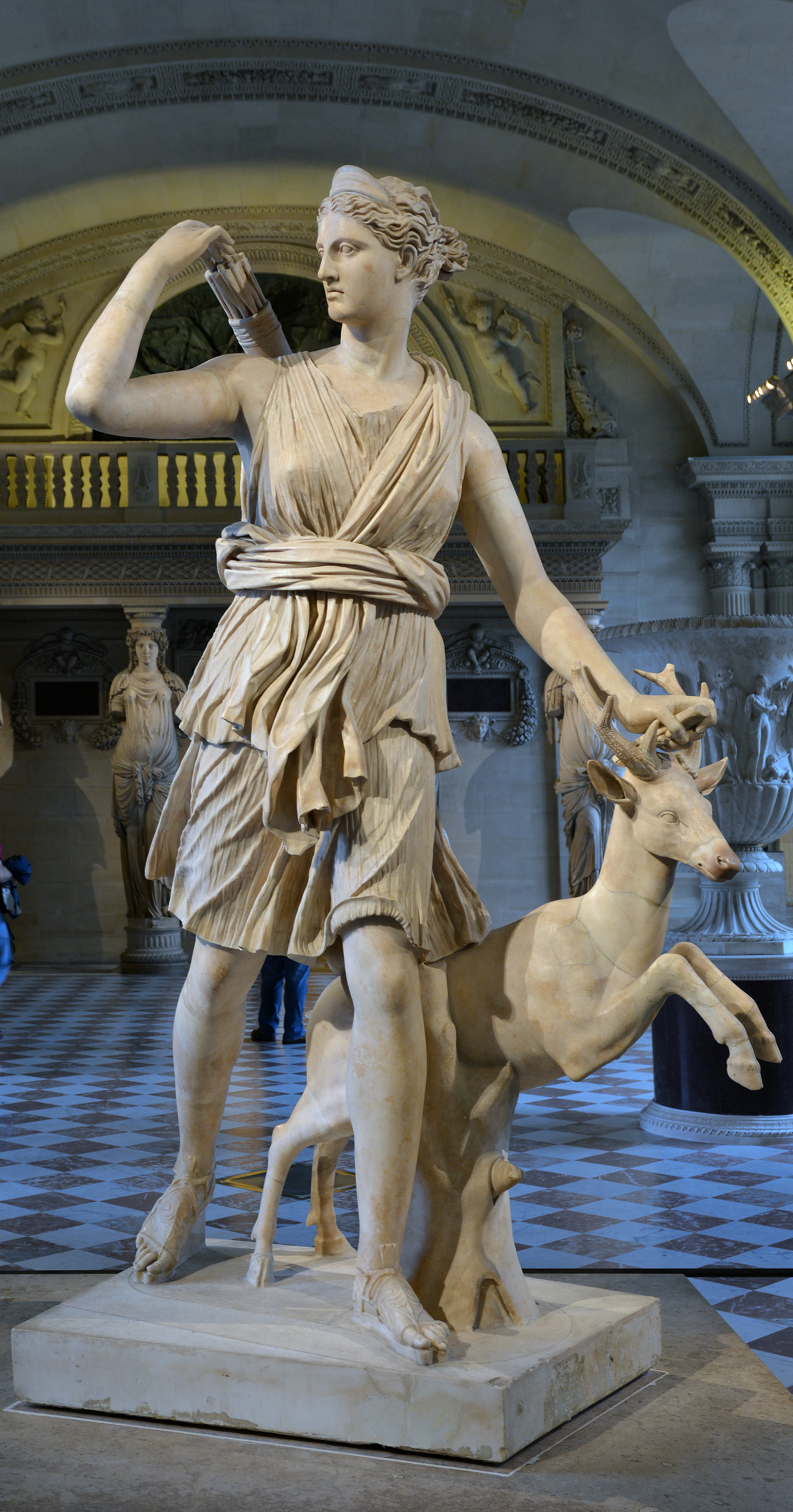
The Diana of Versailles in the Louvre Galerie des Caryatides that was designed for it

The Diana of Versailles or Artemis, Goddess of the Hunt (French: Artémis, déesse de la chasse) is a slightly over-lifesize marble statue of the Roman goddess Diana (Greek: Artemis) with a deer. It is now in the Musée du Louvre, Paris. The statue is also known as Diana with a Doe (French: Diane à la biche), Diana Huntress (French: Diane chasseresse), and Diana of Ephesus. It is a partially restored Roman copy (1st or 2nd century CE) of a lost Greek bronze original attributed to Leochares, c. 325 BCE.

== Description ==
Diana is represented at the hunt, hastening forward, as if in pursuit of game. She looks toward the right and with raised right arm is about to draw an arrow from her quiver. Her left arm has been restored, and a deer has been added at her feet, although one might have expected a dog. Her left hand is holding a small cylindrical fragment, which may be part of what was once a bow. She wears a short Dorian chiton, a himation around her waist, and sandals. Her second toes are longer than her big toes, a condition known as Morton's toe.

== History ==
The statue was given by Pope Paul IV to Henry II of France in 1556 with a subtle but inescapable allusion to the king's mistress, Diane de Poitiers. It was probably discovered in Italy. One source suggests the Temple of Diana (Nemi), an ancient sanctuary; another posits Hadrian's Villa at Tibur.

"Alone amongst the statues exported from Italy before the second half of the seventeenth century the Diane Chasseresse acquired a reputation outside Italy equivalent to the masterpieces in the Belvedere or the Villa Borghese", though its admirers generally confused it with the Artemis at the temple of Ephesus. It was installed as the central feature of the Jardin de la Reine (today's Jardin de Diane) laid out west of the Galerie des Cerfs at the Château de Fontainebleau; there it was the most prominently displayed and among the first Roman sculptures to be seen in France.

In 1602, Henri IV removed it to the Palais du Louvre, where the Diana was installed in a gallery specially designed to receive it, the Salle des Antiques (now the Salle des Caryatides). At the time, its restorations were revised by Barthélemy Prieur. In 1696 it was installed in the Grande Galerie (Hall of Mirrors) of Versailles by Louis XIV. As one of France's greatest treasures, the Diane Chasseresse returned to the Louvre in An VI (1798) of the French Republican calendar (Haskell and Penny 1981:196). It was restored once more, in 1802, by Bernard Lange.

== Fountain of Diana at Fontainebleau ==
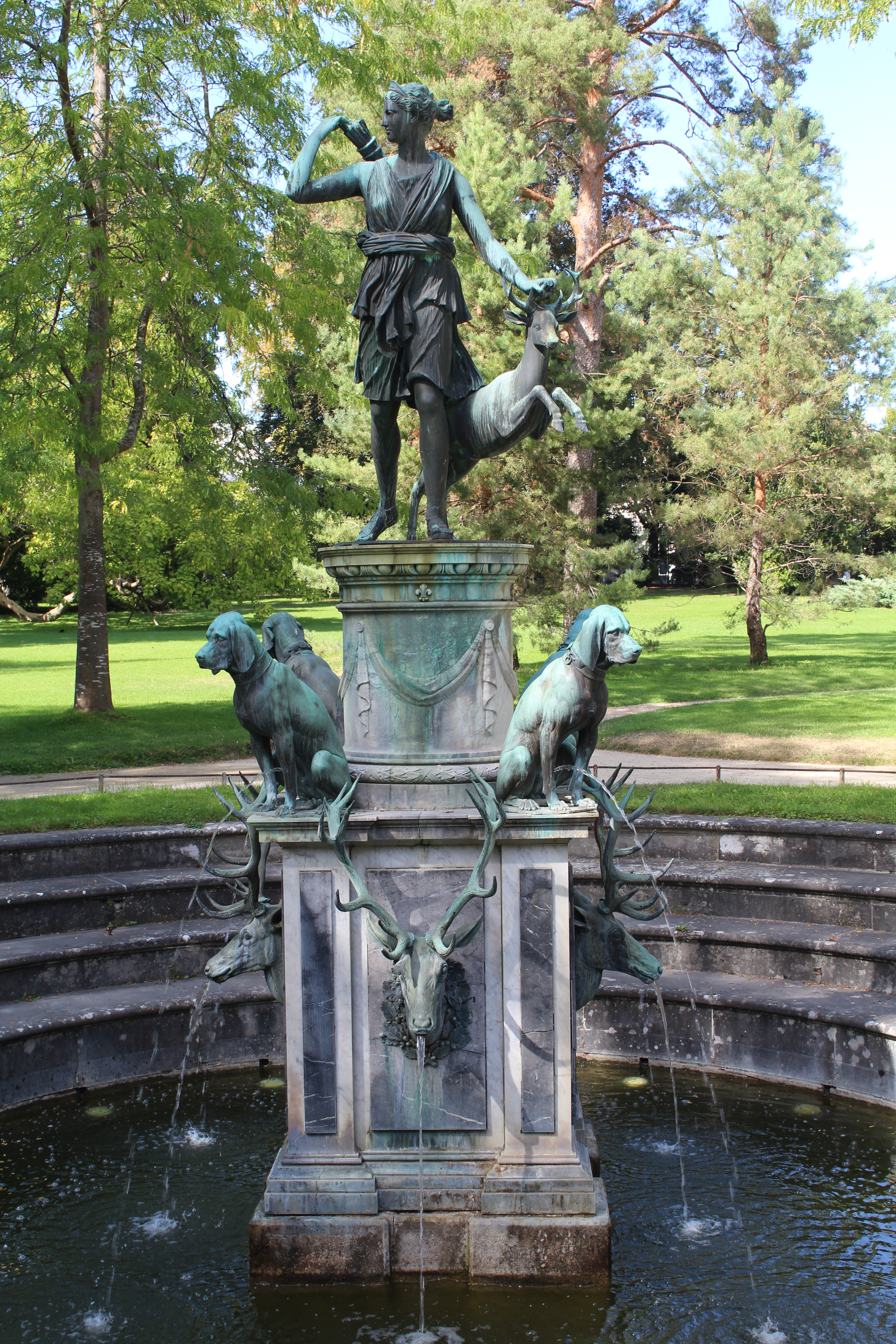
A 1684 bronze copy was installed on the garden fountain at Fontainebleau in 1813

In 1605, after the marble Roman statue had been removed from Fontainebleau, Barthélemy Prieur cast a replacement, a bronze replica which was set upon a high Mannerist marble pedestal, part of a fountain arranged by the hydraulics engineer Tommaso Francini in 1603. The fountain incorporated bronze hunting dogs and stag's heads spitting water, sculpted by Pierre Biard, and was located in the Jardin de la Reine, with a parterre surrounded by an orangery.

At the time of the French Revolution, Prieur's bronze was sent to the Louvre, but in 1813, Emperor Napoleon offered it to Empress Joséphine to decorate her Château de Malmaison. At the same time, he ordered the present bronze, a replica cast by the Keller brothers in 1684 and formerly at the Château de Marly (demolished 1806), be placed on the fountain at Fontainebleau. Prieur's bronze was later returned to the Louvre and only in the 20th century was it brought back to Fontainebleau, where it was placed in the Galerie des Cerfs.

== Other replicas ==
Comparable Roman replicas of the same model, noted by the Louvre's website, have been found at Leptis Magna (Libya), at Antalya (Turkey) and also Annaba (Algeria).

Besides the modern era replicas by Prieur and the Keller brothers, a full-size bronze replica was made in 1634 by Hubert Le Sueur for Charles I of England, the brother-in-law of Louis XIII. For Marly, a marble copy was executed by Guillaume Coustou in 1710. In the second half of the 18th century, numerous replicas of all sizes were created in bronze, plaster, and lead (Haskell and Penny 1981:197).

=== RMS Titanic replica ===
A miniature replica of the Diana of Versailles statue was a feature atop one of the first class reception room fireplaces on board the sunken ocean liner RMS Titanic for her maiden voyage in April 1912.

After the wreck of the Titanic was located in September 1985 by Robert Ballard, Ballard carried out a further expedition to the wreck site a year later in 1986, and discovered the Diana of Versailles statue within Titanic’s vast debris field which is scattered across a large section of the ocean floor. The statue was located near to the bow section of the wreck and it was the first time it had been seen in person for over 70 years.

Until the rediscovery of the Diana of Versailles statue in September 2024, many experts had previously believed that it had been consumed by the seabed due to it not being spotted on any other expeditions to Titanic since it was initially photographed in 1986.

On a 2024 expedition to the wreck the statue was sighted within the Titanic's debris field where it was subsequently photographed and documented.

== See also ==
- Fountain of Diana from the Château d'Anet
