= Brézé (surname) =

Coat of arms of the Brézé family

The Brézé family was an old and distinguished French noble Angevin family.

== History ==
The founder and most famous member of the family was Pierre de Brézé (c. 1410–1465), one of the trusted soldiers and statesmen of Charles VII. He was succeeded as seneschal of Normandy by his eldest son, Jacques de Brézé (c. 1440–1490), count of Maulevrier; and then by his grandson, Louis de Brézé (died 1531), husband of the famous Diane de Poitiers, whose tomb in Rouen Cathedral, attributed to Jean Goujon and Jean Cousin the Elder, is a splendid example of French Renaissance work.

The lordship of Brézé passed eventually to Claire Clémence de Maillé, Princess of Condé, who sold it to Thomas Dreux, who took the name of Dreux-Brézé when it was erected into a marquisate. Henri Evrard, marquis de Dreux-Brézé (1762–1829) succeeded his father as master of the ceremonies to Louis XVI in 1781. He died on 27 January 1829, when he was succeeded in the peerage and at court by his son Scipion (1793–1845).

== Notable members of the Brézé family ==
- Pierre de Brézé (c. 1410–1465), courtier and soldier
- Jacques de Brézé (c. 1440–1490), Count of Maulevrier (son of Pierre)
- Charlotte de Brézé (c. 1446–1477), illegitimate daughter of Charles VII of France (wife of Jacques)
- Louis de Brézé, seigneur d'Anet (c. 1460–1531), Sénéchal of Normandy and Master of the Hunt (grandson of Pierre)
- Françoise de Brézé (c. 1518–1577), suo jure Countess of Maulévrier (daughter of Louis)
- Louise de Brézé (1521–1577), Duchess of Aumale and Dame d'Anet (daughter of Louis)
- Urbain de Maillé-Brézé (1597–1650), Marshal of France, Marquis de Brézé
- Claire Clémence de Maillé Brézé (1628–1694), Princess of Condé and Duchess of Fronsac (daughter of Urbain)
- Jean Armand de Maillé-Brézé (1619–1646), Admiral (brother of Claire Clémence)

== See also ==
- Château de Brézé
- Château de Milly-le-Meugon
- Maillé-Brézé (disambiguation)
