= Jean de Poitiers =

French nobleman (d. 1529)

Jean de Poitiers, Seigneur de Saint Vallier (c. 1475 – 1529) was a French nobleman best known as the father of Diane de Poitiers, mistress of King Henry II of France.

== Early life ==
He was the son of Aymar de Poitiers, Marquis of Cotron, and Jeanne de La Tour d'Auvergne.

His maternal grandparents were Bertrand VI, Count of Auvergne and Louise de La Trémoille. His maternal aunt, Anne de la Tour d'Auvergne, was the second wife of Alexander Stewart, Duke of Albany (the Scottish prince and second surviving son of King James II of Scotland) and his uncle, John IV, Count of Auvergne, was the maternal grandfather of Queen Catherine de' Medici (wife of King Henry II of France).

== Plot against Francis I ==
In 1523 he was implicated in a plot against King Francis I of France, discovered by his son-in-law Louis de Brézé, seigneur d'Anet, and in 1524 he was condemned to death, but reprieved by the king. He was imprisoned in the French castle of Loches and was released in 1526. He died three years later, in 1529.

=== In popular culture ===
His story was the inspiration for a character in Victor Hugo's 1832 play Le roi s'amuse who became Count Monterone when Francesco Maria Piave and Giuseppe Verdi relocated the plot of their 1851 opera Rigoletto from France to the Duchy of Mantua.

== Personal life ==
Poitiers married Jeanne de Batarnay, a daughter of Imbert de Batarnay and Georgette de Montchenu. Together, they lived at the Château de Saint-Vallier in Drôme and were the parents of:

- Anne de Poitiers (1489–c. 1539), who married Antoine II de Clermont, son of Louis, Baron and Viscount de Clermont-en-Dauphiné and Catherine Artaud de Montauban.
- Françoise de Poitiers (b. 1499), who married Antoine III de Clermont, 1st Count of Clermont-Tonnerre, son of Bernardin de Clermont Tonnerre and Françoise de Sassenage.
- Diane de Poitiers (1500–1566), who married Louis de Brézé, Seigneur d'Anet, a grandson of King Charles VII by his mistress Agnès Sorel, in 1515.

Poitiers died in 1529.
