= List of reportedly haunted locations in France =

List of locations reportedly possessed by supernatural beings in France

There are numerous reportedly haunted locations in France. This list alphabetizes by region (including overseas regions and collectivities) these places and then alphabetically within each region (including overseas regions and collectivities).

== Regions ==
=== Auvergne ===
- Lake Pavin: Situated near the mountain town of Besse, Pavin has been associated with hauntings and disappearances since the 16th century.

=== Brittany ===
- Château de Trécesson: among the various legends attached to this castle are those of the Dames Blanches (White Ladies), the headless curate, the phantom card players and the Manoir du Pied d'Ânon.

=== Île-de-France ===
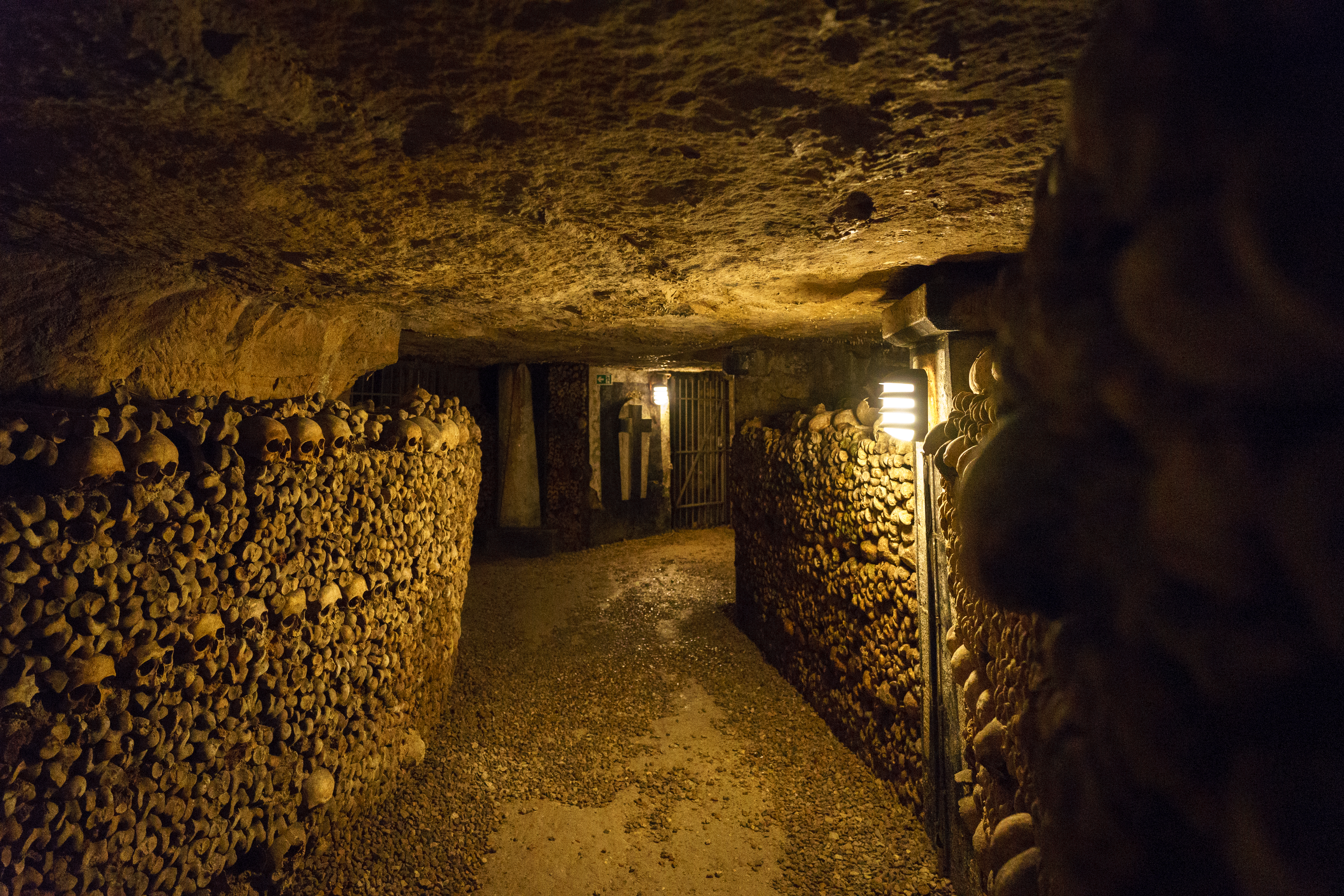
Catacombs of Paris

- Catacombes de Paris : It is said to be haunted by strange orbs and human figures from different centuries. There have also been reports of voices being heard through the walls, and the feeling of a presence or a touch by someone not there.
- Eiffel Tower
- Château de Versailles: once home to the French royal family between 1682 and 1789, a few tourists and employees have reported seeing people in 18th-century clothing. There have also been sightings of the beheaded Queen Marie Antoinette, orbs and ghostly presences in tourists' photos, and descriptions of being touched by ghosts.

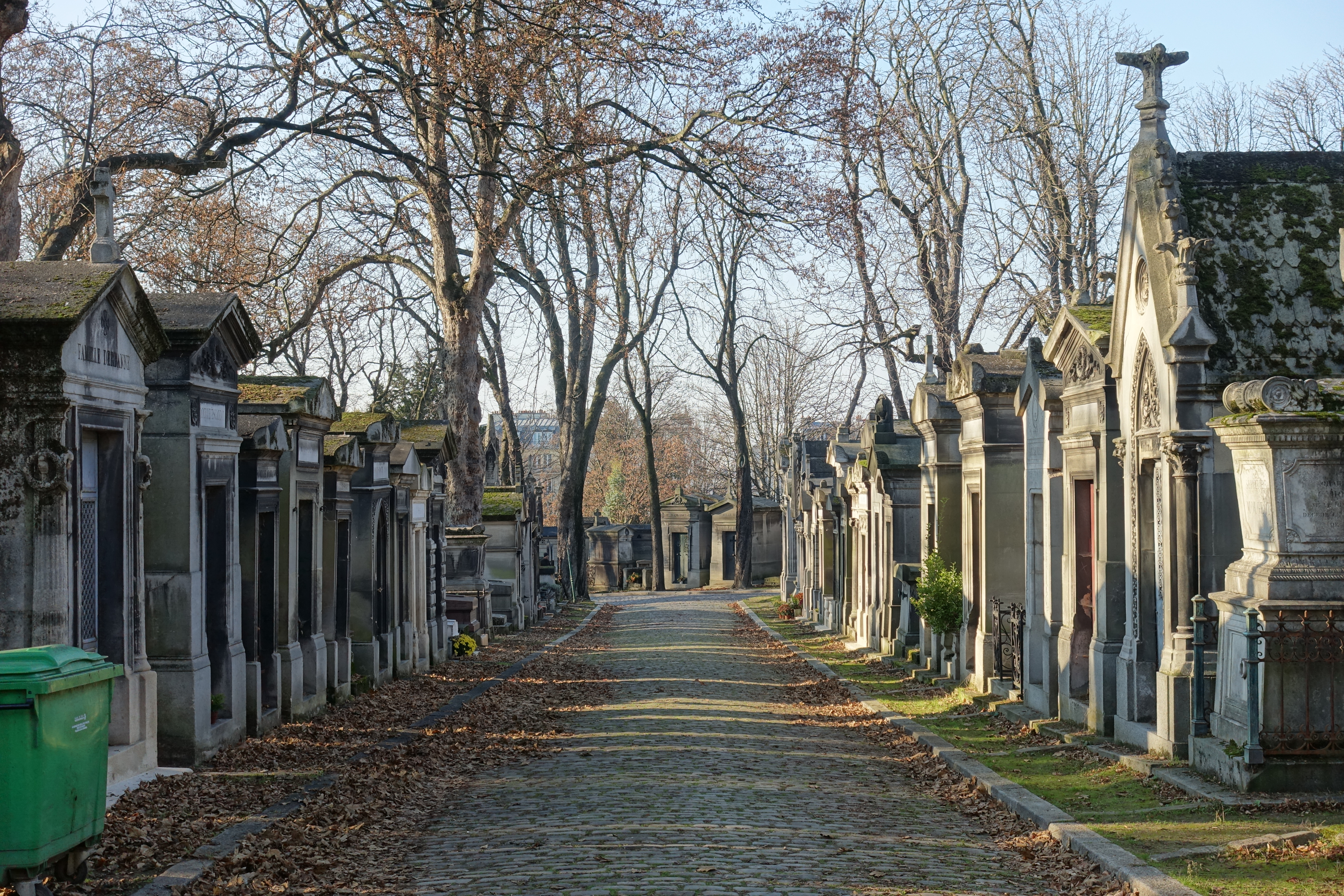
Père Lachaise Cemetery

- Cimetière du Père-Lachaise: the largest cemetery in Paris, France; in the northeast part of the modern city, it is the most visited cemetery in the world, and is said to be one of the most haunted cemeteries in Europe. Some people have experienced overwhelming shivers and a sense of unease, while others have experienced a feeling of calmness. Claims have been made of photos from visitors and investigators revealing orbs and ghostly apparitions.
- Louvre
- Notre-Dame de Paris
- Jardin des Tuileries
- Parc Montsouris
- Place de la Bastille

=== Normandy ===
- Mont-Saint-Michel
- Mortemer, Seine-Maritime: ghostly sightings of monks wandering the area have been reported.

=== Nouvelle-Aquitaine ===
- Château de Bonaguil
- Château de Puymartin

=== Occitanie ===
- Palavas-les-Flots

=== Pays de la Loire ===
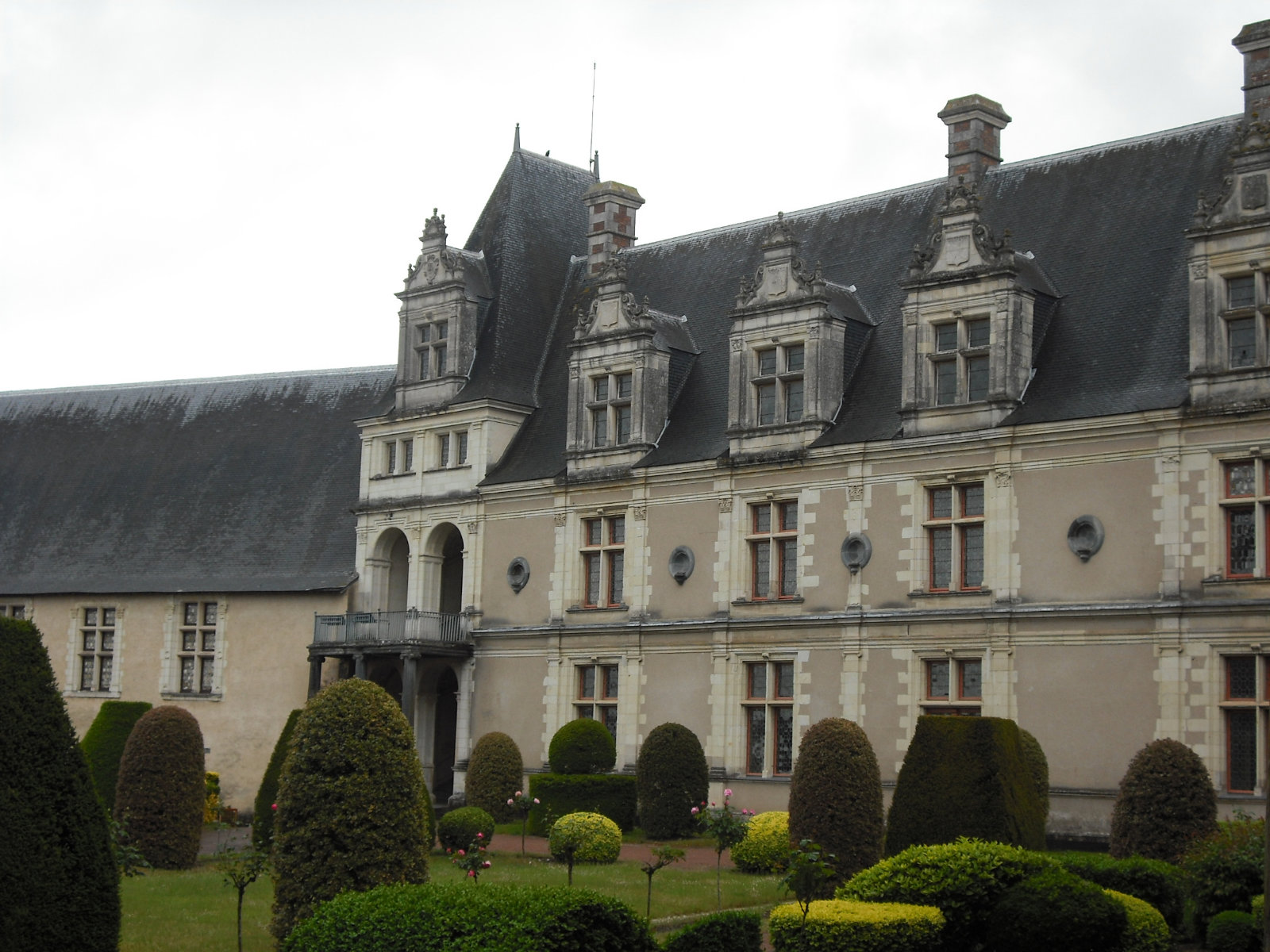
Château de Châteaubriant, said to be haunted by the ghost of Françoise de Foix.

- Château de Brissac: legend says that Jacques de Brézé caught his wife, Charlotte de Valois, with another man, and in a fit of rage murdered them both. Tourists have reported a sense of an eerie feeling, slight touches, ghostly sightings, and wailing throughout the halls.
- Château de Châteaubriant: this castle in the Loire-Atlantique département of western France is said to be haunted by the ghost of Françoise de Foix, a mistress of King Francis I. According to the legend, she was locked in her bed chambers by her husband, Jean de Laval-Châteaubriant, Governor of Brittany, jealous of her relationship with the King. She died on 16 October 1537, rumored to have been either poisoned or bled to death. Since then, there have been ghostly sightings at the château every 16 October at midnight.

=== Provence-Alpes-Côte d'Azur ===
- Gréoux-les-Bains
