= Province of Normandy =

The Province of Normandy existed de facto from the taking of the former Duchy of Normandy by the French crown in 1204 until the abolition of the French provinces in 1790 and their replacement with departments.

Before 1204, the Duchy of Normandy was one of the key lands in the Angevin Empire. King Philip Augustus of France had begun to take parts of Normandy from the rule of King John of England in 1203, but John continued to rule over and control most of the duchy, including the capital of Rouen and the key economic areas of the lower Seine River. In March 1204, the Chateu-Gaillard fell to the French forces under Philip Augustus. This led to the capital of Rouen and the vital economic areas of the lower Seine coming under French control and to the effective start of the Province of Normandy.

The direct acquisition of Normandy in 1204 greatly increased the income and power of the French state.

Much of the area would later come under English occupation. Including from 1415-1450. During the period starting in 1417, Henry V of England and others on his side in the Hundred Years War began to take over land in the Province of Normandy. For this reason, some sources date the start of the Province of Normandy to 1450.

It was abolished in 1790 and replaced by 5 departments.

== Seneschals ==
Below is a list of the seneschals (sénéchal de Normandie) and governors of Normandy (gouverneur de Normandie) during its time as a French province.

- 1451–1460: Pierre de Brézé, lord of the Varenne and Brissac, count of Maulévrier
- 1460–1464: Louis d'Estouteville
- 1475–1494: Jacques de Brézé, lord of Bec-Crespin and Mauny, count of Maulévier
- 1494–1499: Louis de Brézé, lord of Bec-Crespin, Mauny, and Anet, count of Maulévrier
- 9 May 1661 – 1726: Charles François Frédéric de Montmorency, Duke of Piney
- 1726 – 18 May 1764: Marshal of France Charles François Frédéric de Montmorency II, Duke of Piney
- 15 June 1764 – 1775: Marshal of France Anne-Pierre, Duke of Harcourt
- 17 September 1775 – 1 January 1791: François Henri, Duke of Harcourt

== See also ==
- History of Normandy
