= Seneschal of Ponthieu =

The Seneschal of Ponthieu was an officer carrying out and managing the domestic affairs of the lord of the County of Ponthieu. During the course of the twelfth century, the seneschalship, also became an office of military command.

The seneschal managed the household, coordinating between the receivers of various landholdings and the chamber, treasury, and the chancellory or chapel. The seneschals of Ponthieu, like those appointed in Normandy, Poitou, and Anjou had custody of demesne fortresses, the regional treasuries, and presidency of the highest court of regional custom.

== List of Seneschals ==
- Thomas de Sandwich (1280)
- John Bakewell (1299-1305)
- Richard de Rokesle (1307-1308)
- John Deluanay (1309)
- John Lenfant (1312-1315)
- Robert de Fiennes (1316-1320)
- John de Castre (1320-1322)
- Bartholomew de Burghersh (1337)
- Nicholas Louvaine of Penshurst (1364)
