= Marie de Valois =

French royal (1444–1473)

- Countess of Taillebourg
- Full name: Marie Marguerite de Valois
- Born: 1444
- Died: 1473 (aged 28–29)
- Noble family: Valois
- Spouse: Olivier de Coétivy, Count of Taillebourg
- Father: Charles VII of France
- Mother: Agnès Sorel

Marie Marguerite de Valois (1444–1473) was the illegitimate daughter of King Charles VII of France and his mistress Agnès Sorel.

She had two sisters, Charlotte de Valois (1446–1477) and Jeanne de Valois (born 1448).

Marie married Olivier de Coétivy, Count of Taillebourg.

== Sources ==
- Booton, Diane E. (2010). Manuscripts, Market and the Transition to Print in Late Medieval Brittany. Ashgate Publishing Limited.
- Vale, M. (1 October 1974). Charles VII. University of California Press. ISBN 978-0-520-02787-9.
