= Pierre de Brézé =

French soldier & politician (c.1410–1465)

Pierre de Brézé Count of Maulevrier and Évreux
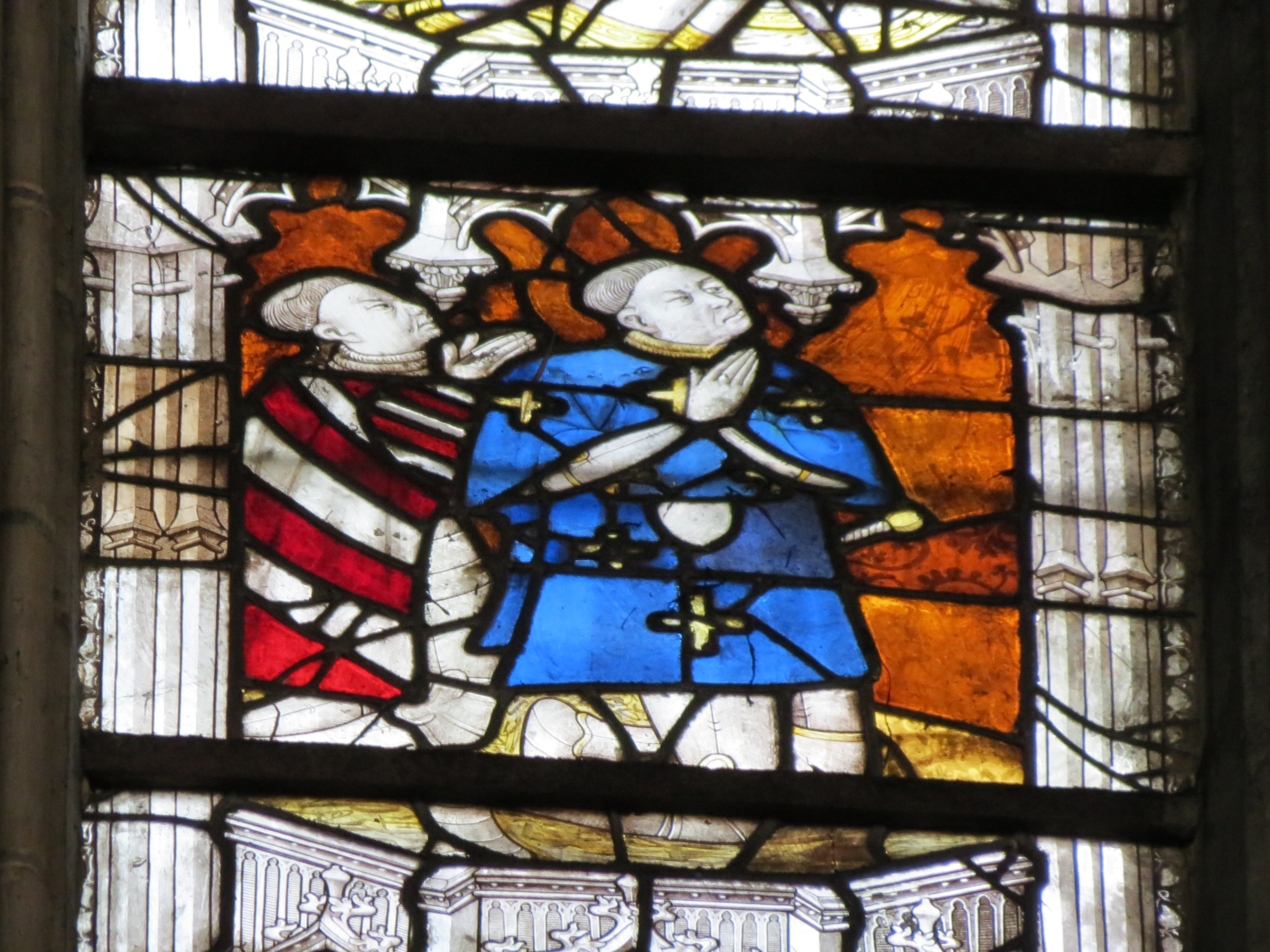
- Born: c. 1410
- Died: 16 July 1465 (aged 54–55); Montlhéry, France
- Occupations: Courtier, soldier
- Spouse: Jeanne du Bec-Crespin
- Children: Françoise de Brézé; Jeanne de Brézé; Jacques de Brézé
- Parent(s): Pierre I de Brézé; Clémence Carbonnel
- Relatives: Louis de Brézé (grandson)

Pierre II de Brézé or de Brezé (c. 1410 – 16 July 1465), Count of Maulevrier and Évreux (French: Comte de Maulévrier et d'Évreux), was a French soldier and courtier in the service of kings Charles VII and Louis XI. He is sometimes distinguished from others of his house as Pierre II.

== Early life ==
Pierre de Brézé was born c. 1410. He was the son of Pierre I de Brézé (d. c. 1427) and Clémence Carbonnel.

== Career ==
De Brézé rose to prominence during the Hundred Years' War. In 1433, he arrested Georges de La Trémoille on a royal warrant, after Yolande of Aragon and constable Arthur de Richemont forced him from power. De Brézé was knighted by Charles of Anjou in 1434 and subsequently joined the royal council. In 1437 he became seneschal of Anjou, and in 1440 of Poitou. During the Praguerie he served with the king's forces against those of the rebel nobles and the dauphin (heir apparent) Louis XI, who would bear a lasting grudge against him.

De Brézé fought against the English in Normandy in 1440–1441 and in Guienne in 1442. He was granted the title of Count of Évreux in 1441 for his role in the strategic maneuvers during Charles VII's Siege of Pontoise, which finally expelled the English from Île-de-France. The following year he became chamberlain to Charles VII and, through the influence of royal mistress Agnès Sorel, surpassed in power his old allies Arthur de Richemont and Charles of Anjou. The six years (1444–1450) of his ascendancy aligned with the most prosperous period of the reign of Charles VII. His most dangerous opponent in the royal court was the dauphin Louis, who in 1448 levied accusations against him, instigating a formal trial which ultimately resulted in his complete exoneration and his restoration to royal favor. He fought in Normandy from 1450 to 1451 and became grand seneschal of the province, after the death of Agnès Sorel and the consequent decline of his influence at court.

He made an ineffective raid on the English coast at Sandwich in 1457, possibly at the instigation of his first cousin Margaret of Anjou, a supporter of the House of Lancaster in the War of the Roses who had previously sought his intervention to restrict the movements of Richard Neville. Charles restricted involvement in the conflict until the Lancastrian loss at Towton, after which he allowed De Brézé a freer hand. His forces seized Jersey in the Channel Islands in May 1461, but he was stripped of his offices and imprisoned in Loches castle upon the succession to the French throne of Louis XI, who distrusted his father's former close advisors. Margaret of Anjou secured his release as part of the Chinon Agreement in April 1462, and De Brézé himself was permitted to accompany Margaret to Scotland with a force of 800 men. The same year, his son Jacques married Louis's half-sister, Charlotte de Valois, daughter of Agnès Sorel. After the defeat of House Lancaster at the Battle of Hexham, he brought her back to Flanders. On his return, he was more fully reconciled with Louis XI and reappointed Seneschal of Normandy. De Brézé died fighting for Louis XI at the Battle of Montlhéry on 16 July, 1465. He was succeeded as seneschal of Normandy by his eldest son Jacques.

== Personal life ==
Brézé was married to Jeanne du Bec-Crespin, Lady of Bec-Crépin and Mauny. He inherited the Château du Bec-Crespin from his brother-in-law Antoine Crespin in 1454. Together, they were the parents of:

- Françoise de Brézé (1432–1484), who married Giles de Saint-Germain.
- Jeanne de Brézé (b. 1439), who married Jean III de Vendôme.
- Jacques de Brézé (c. 1440–1490), Count of Maulevrier, who married Charlotte de Valois, the illegitimate daughter of Charles VII by his mistress Agnès Sorel.

=== Legacy ===
The best contemporary account of Pierre de Brézé is given in the Chroniques of the Burgundian chronicler, Georges Chastellain, who had been his secretary. Chastellain addressed a Déprécation to Louis XI on his behalf at the time of his disgrace. Jersey remained in French hands until 1468, and several of De Brézé's innovations or innovations credited to him were long continued on the Channel Islands.

== Sources ==
- Ambühl, Rémy (2016). "Hostages and the Laws of War: The Surrender of the Castle and Palace of Rouen". In Bennett, Matthew; Weikert, Katherine (eds.). Medieval Hostageship c.700-c.1500: Hostage, Captive, Prisoner of War, Guarantee, Peacemaker. Routledge.
- Bates, David; Gazeau, Veronique, eds. (2006). Liens personnels, réseaux, solidarités en France et dans les îles. Publications de la Sorbonne.
- Carment-Lanfry, Anne-Marie (2010). La Cathédrale Notre-Dame de Rouen. Publication des Universites de Rouen et du Havre.
- Gillingham, John (1981). The Wars of the Roses. Louisiana State University Press.
- Gross, Anthony (2020). "A Mirror for a Princess: Antoine de la Sale and the Political Psyche of Margaret of Anjou". In Clark, Linda (ed.). The Fifteenth Century XVII. Boydell Publishing.
- Lewis, P.S. (1968). Later medieval France: the polity. St Martin's Press.
- Thornton, Tim (2012). The Channel Islands, 1370-1640: Between England and Normandy. The Boydell Press.
- Warner, Marina (2000). Joan of Arc: The Image of Female Heroism. University of California Press.
- Wellman, Kathleen (2013). Queens and Mistresses of Renaissance France. Yale University Press.
