= Maillé-Brézé =

Maillé-Brézé may refer to:

== People ==
- Urbain de Maillé-Brézé (1597–1650), Marshal of France, General, Top French aristocrat
- Jean Armand de Maillé-Brézé (1619–1646), French First Grand Admiral
- Claire-Clémence de Maillé-Brézé (1628–1694), wife of Louis II de Bourbon, Prince de Condé

== Other ==
- French ship Maillé Brézé:
  - French destroyer Maillé Brézé (1931)
  - French destroyer Maillé-Brézé (D627)
