= Saint-Vallier, Drôme =

Saint-Vallier
- Commune
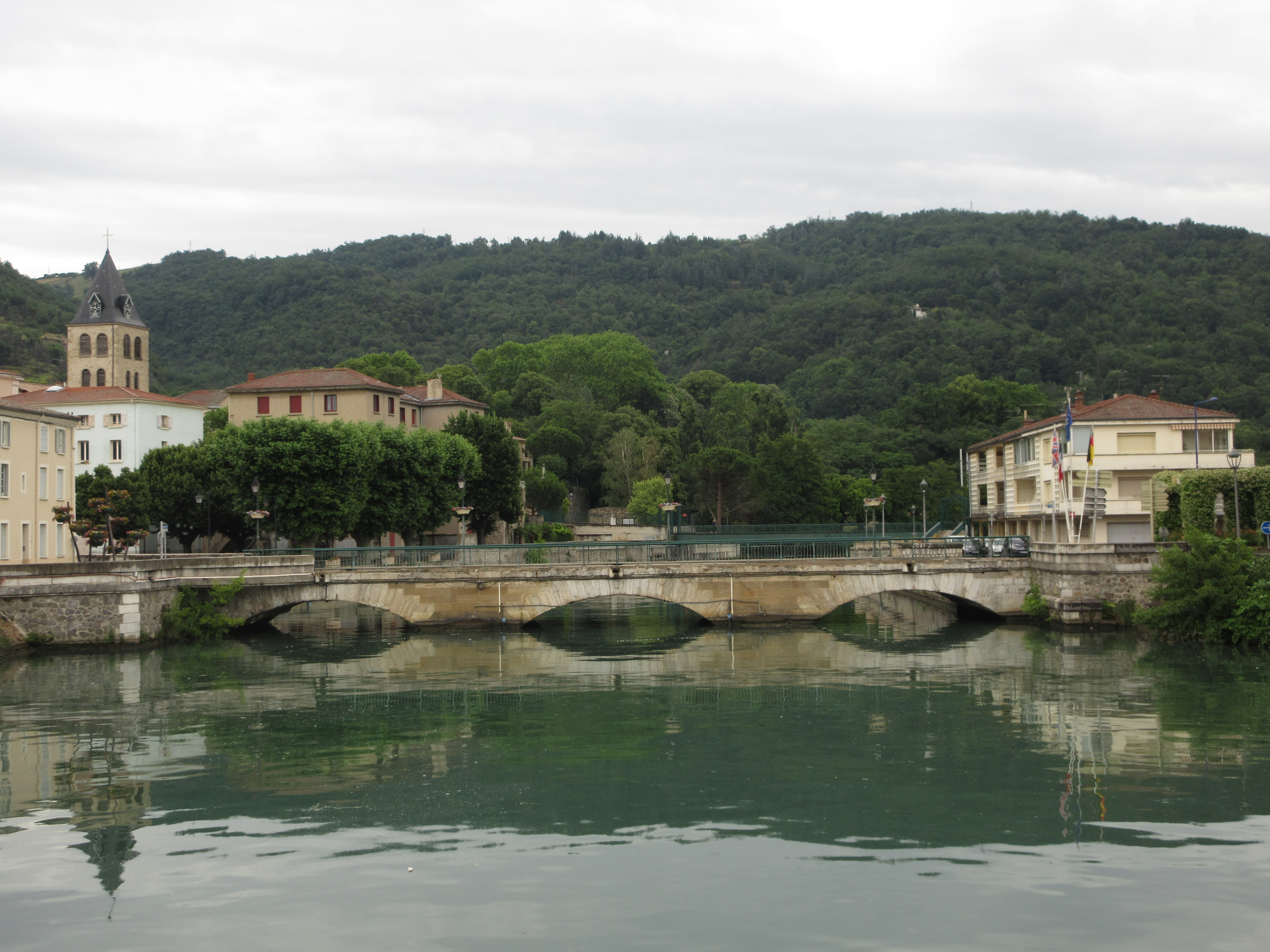
- A general view of Saint-Vallier

- Coat of arms
- Location of Saint-Vallier
- Location within France Location within Auvergne-Rhône-Alpes
- Coordinates: 45°10′44″N 4°48′54″E
- Country: France
- Region: Auvergne-Rhône-Alpes
- Department: Drôme
- Arrondissement: Valence
- Canton: Saint-Vallier
- Intercommunality: Porte de Dromardèche

Government
  - Mayor (2024–2026): Frédérique Sapet
- Area^{1}: 5.42 km^{2} (2.09 sq mi)
- Elevation: 158 m (518 ft)
- Highest elevation: 364 m (1,194 ft)
- Lowest elevation: 131 m (430 ft)
- Population (2023): 4,027
  - Density: 743/km^{2} (1,920/sq mi)
- Time zone: UTC+01:00 (CET)
  - Summer (DST): UTC+02:00 (CEST)
- INSEE/Postal code: 26333 /26240
- ^{1} French Land Register data, which excludes lakes, ponds, glaciers > 1 km^{2} (0.386 sq mi or 247 acres) and river estuaries.

Saint-Vallier (French pronunciation: [sɛ̃ valje]; Arpitan: Sent-Valiér) is a commune in the Drôme department in southeastern France. It is an administrative, commercial and industrial town at the confluence of the rivers Galaure and Rhone.

== Geography ==
The town is situated on the banks of the Rhone, 30 kilometres (19 mi) north of Valence. The Galaure flows northwest through the southern part of the commune, crosses the town, then flows into the Rhone, which forms the commune's western border.

The town covers an area of 464 hectares (1,150 acres) and has just over four thousand inhabitants.

It is the county town of the canton and is important as an administrative, industrial and commercial centre. It has developed in a linear fashion along the bank of the Rhone and has a catchment area of about fifteen thousand inhabitants. It has a number of factories and industrial units making aviation parts, ceramic insulators, nuclear taps, tiles and stationery.

== History ==
=== Ancient Rome ===
The Roman town of Ursuli was built on this site at the confluence of the Galaure and the Rhone.

=== Middle Ages ===
The Château de Diane de Poitiers was built in the fifteenth century. It is flanked by corner towers that dominate the Galaure River. The château is surrounded by a landscaped garden designed by Le Nôtre. Château des Rioux is another ancient castle beside the three hectare Parc à l'Anglaise. It originally housed a religious community of monks but was rebuilt in the nineteenth century by Comte Dupeyroux de Salmagne. It offers accommodation in a gite and four guest chambers. The old city walls are still visible on the Place Orsolles and there is a covered market, built in 1852.

=== Modern ===
In the eighteenth century, feldspar and kaolin were found in the area and an industry grew up making hard-paste porcelain fired at a high temperature.

On August 16, 1944, 28 American B17s tried to destroy the railroad bridge, causing many deaths and damage to the south of the town.

More information on the history and the "Montrebut" paleontological site of Saint-Vallier is available in a dedicated room near the local council building.

== Population ==
Historical population
Year	Pop.	±% p.a.
1968	4,927	—
1975	5,137	+0.60%
1982	4,442	−2.06%
1990	4,115	−0.95%
1999	4,154	+0.10%
2007	4,010	−0.44%
2012	3,990	−0.10%
2017	3,915	−0.38%
2023	4,027	+0.47%
Source: INSEE

== Fossil site ==
Near Saint-Vallier, on the "Montrebut" hill, there is a fossil bed that serves as a biostratigraphical reference locality. Flowing water has buried the remains of animals over many millennia and careful excavations can help paleontologists understand the relative ages of different rock strata according to the different fossil remains found. This is one of only two locations in which fossils of the extinct badger species Meles thorali have been found.

== Personalities ==
Saint-Vallier is the birthplace of Diane de Poitiers, one of the most well-known of French royal mistresses, born in 1499. She became the favourite of Henry II of France and wielded much power until he was fatally wounded in 1559 in a jousting tournament and his widow, Catherine de' Medici, expelled her from the court.

== Main sights ==
=== Castles ===
- Castle of Diane de Poitiers / of Chabrillan (Mérimée), with garden designed by André Le Nôtre.
- Castle of Rioux
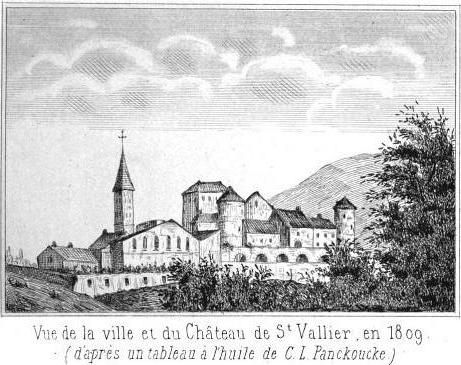
View of the town and castle in 1809, from a painting of C.L. Panckoucke

=== Downtown ===
- The city walls
- Old town houses, some of which date from the Middle Ages
- The hall, rebuilt in 1852
- The Saint-Valéry church (Mérimée)
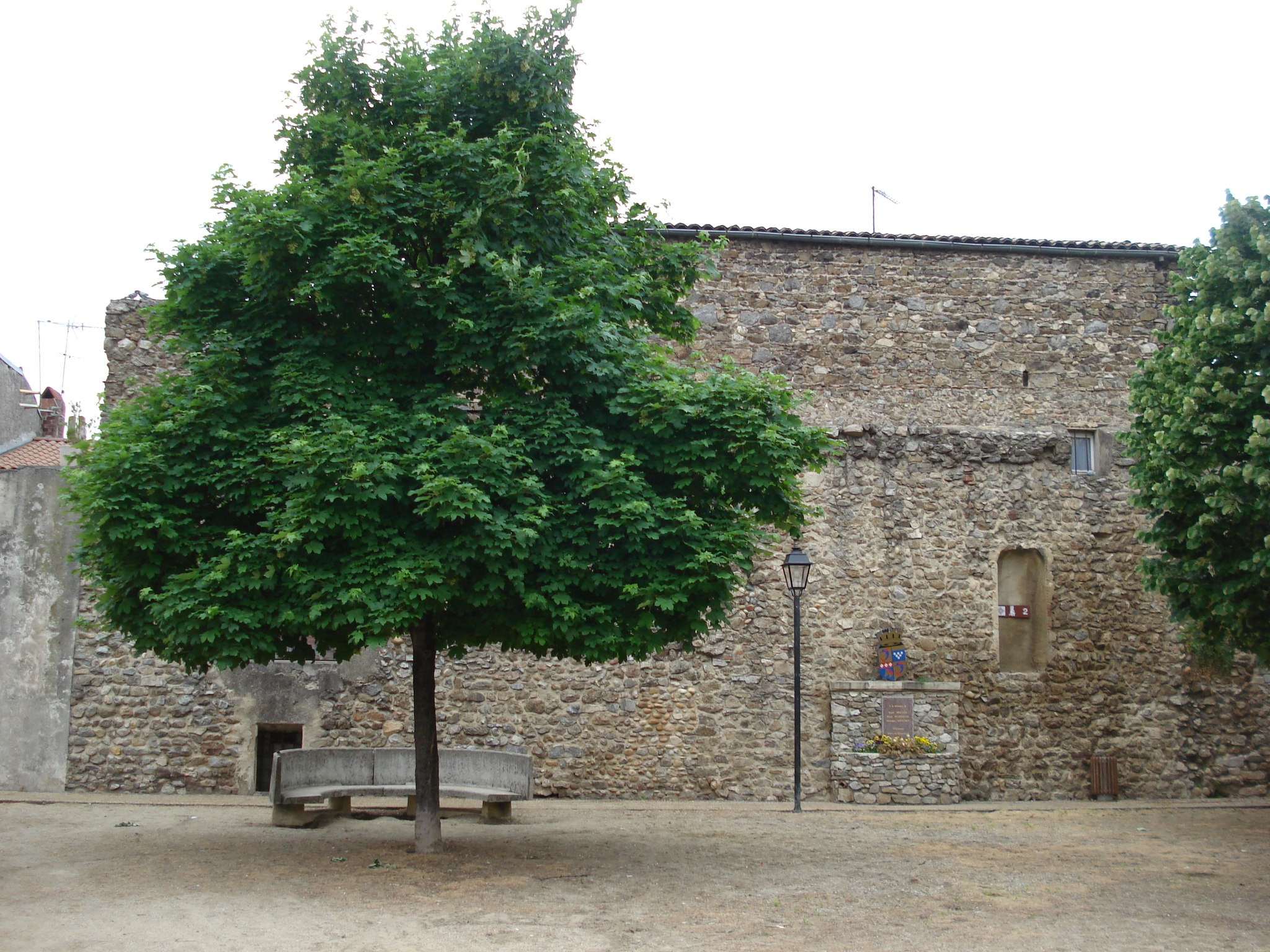
City walls on the place Orsolles

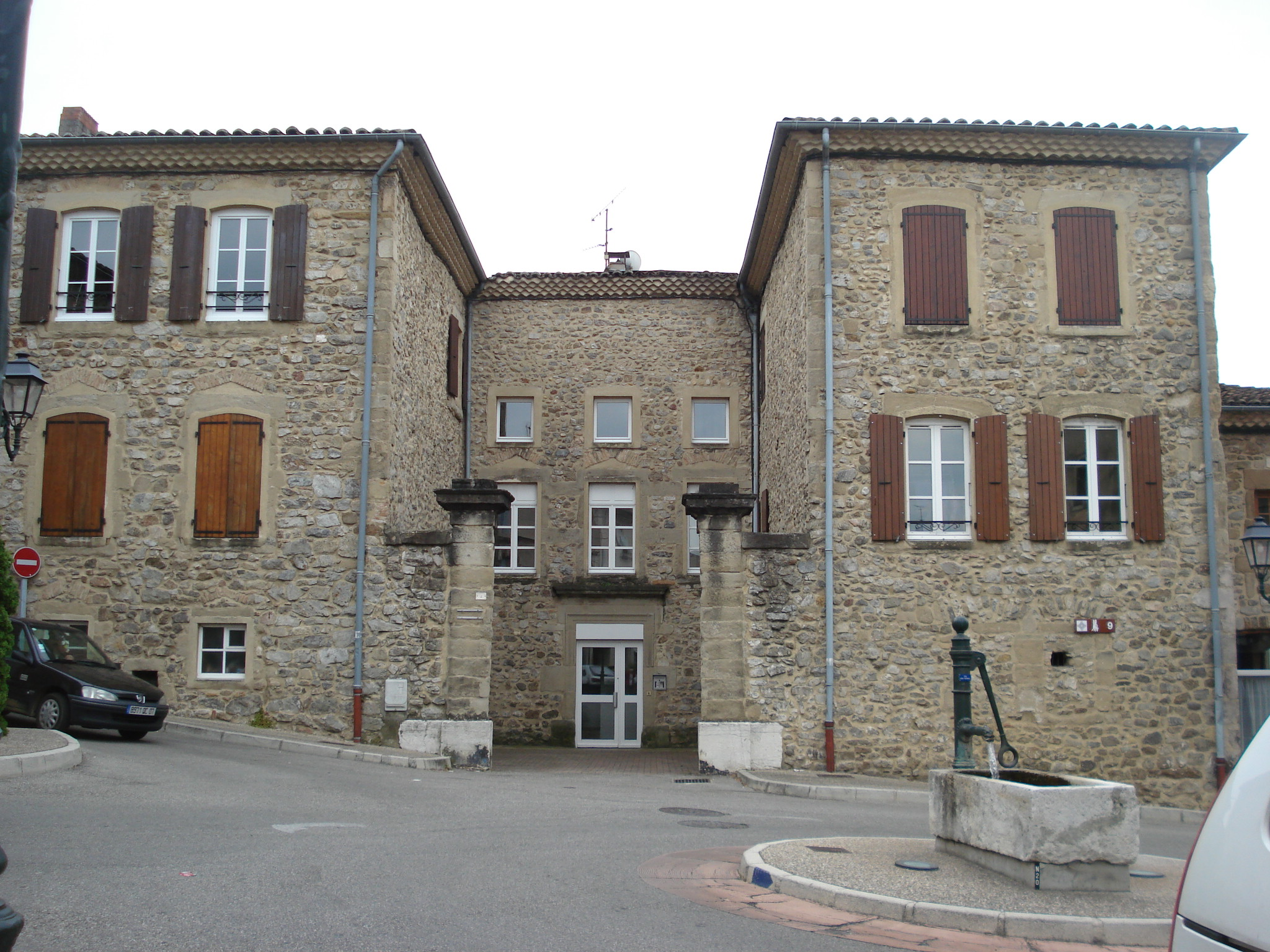
Place of the pump

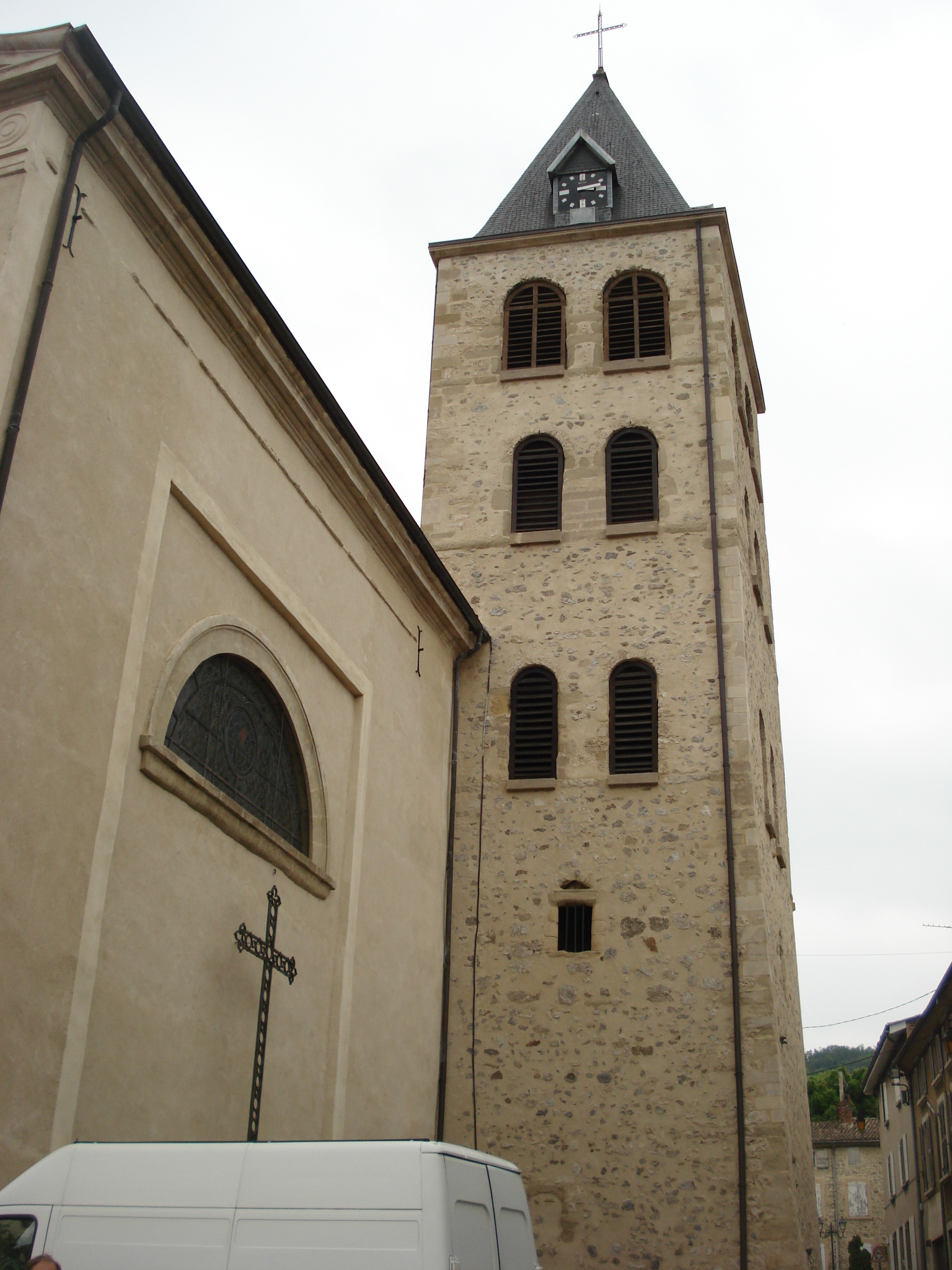
Church Saint-Valéry

=== Others ===
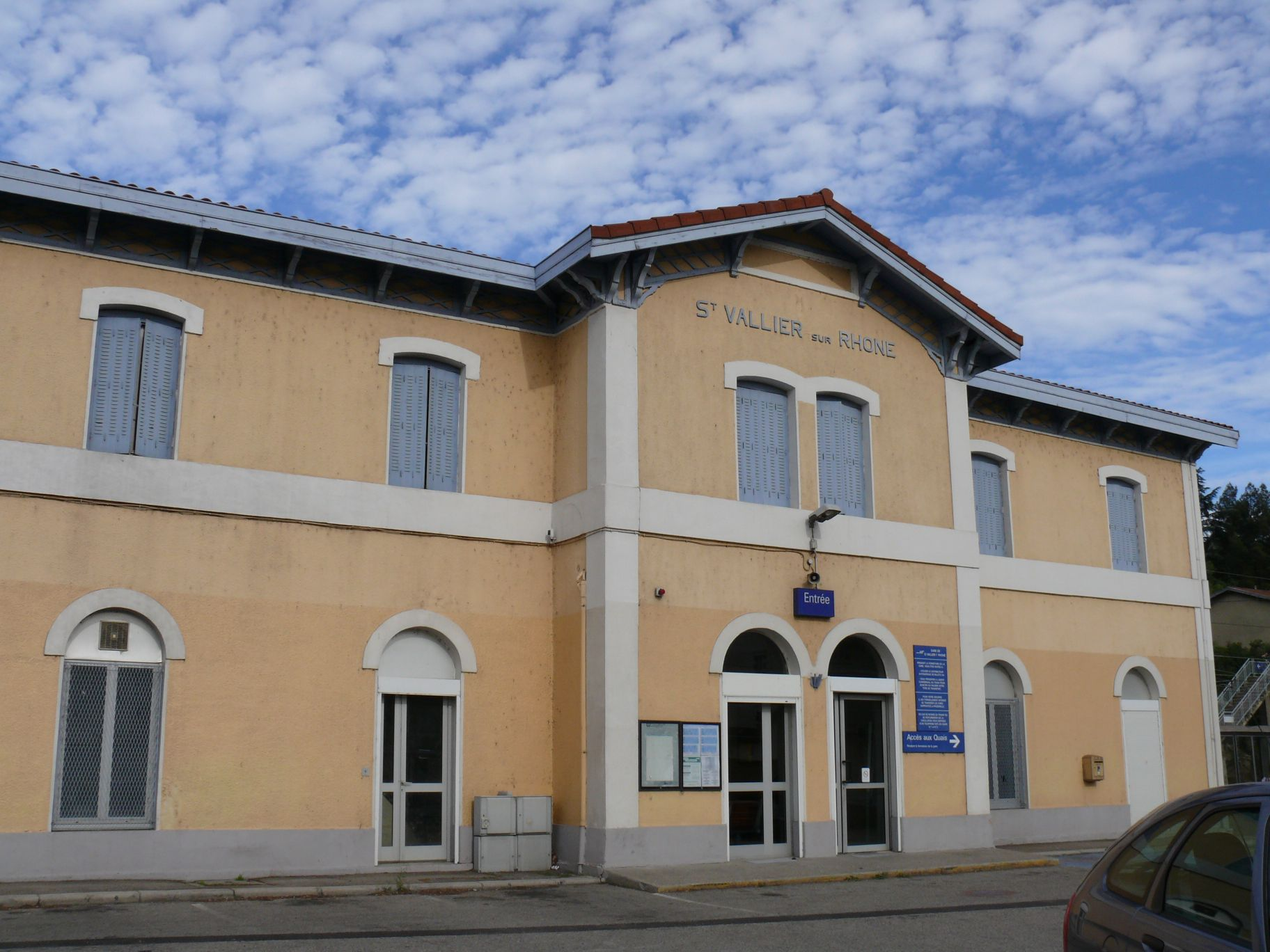
The train station

== See also ==
- Communes of the Drôme department
- Norbert Dentressangle
