= Château du Bec-Crespin =

Historic castle in Normandy, France

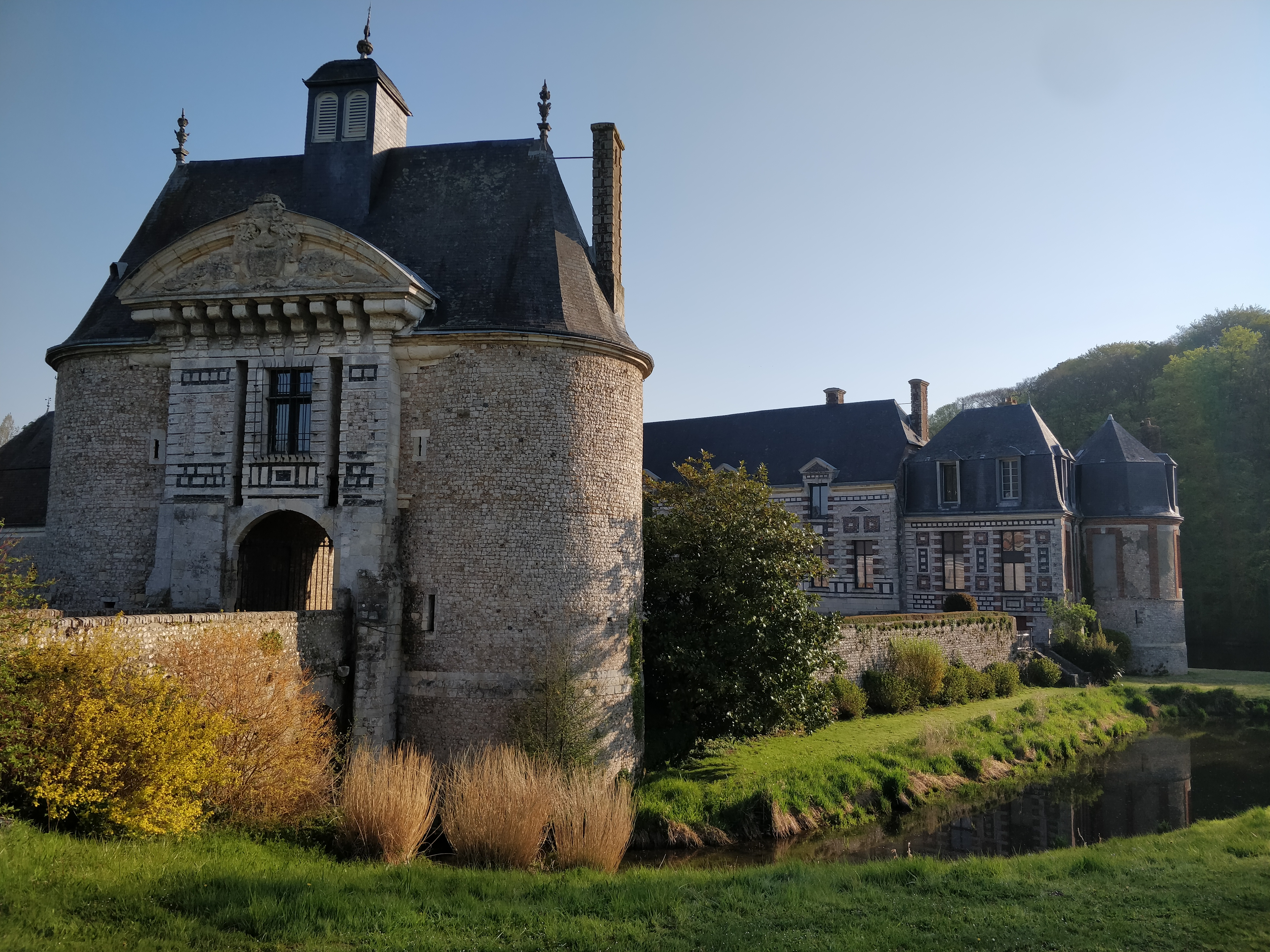
- Interactive map of the Château du Bec-Crespin area

General information
- Coordinates: 49.5976°N 0.2073°E

The Château du Bec-Crespin is a historic castle in Saint-Martin-du-Bec, Seine-Maritime, Upper Normandy, France, 20 km north of Le Havre. It is now a luxury hotel.

== History ==
An earlier castle stood here in the tenth century.

The castle was inherited by Pierre de Brézé from his brother-in-law, Antoine Crespin, in 1454. It was later inherited by Louis de Brézé. In 1579, it was acquired by Nicolas Romé de Fresquiennes.

During the Reign of Terror, the castle was used as a prison for Roman Catholic priests. The castle was restored in 1844–48.

The castle was rented to Henri Carton de Wiart from 1916 onwards, when he was the Belgian Minister of Justice. Guests included Maurice Barrès, Louis Barthou and René Bazin.

The castle is now a luxury hotel.

== Architectural significance ==
It has been listed as an official historical monument since December 22, 1952.
