= Diane de Poitiers =

French noblewoman and courtier (1500–1566)

- Grand Senechal of Normandy; Countess of Saint-Vallier; Duchess of Valentinois and Étampes
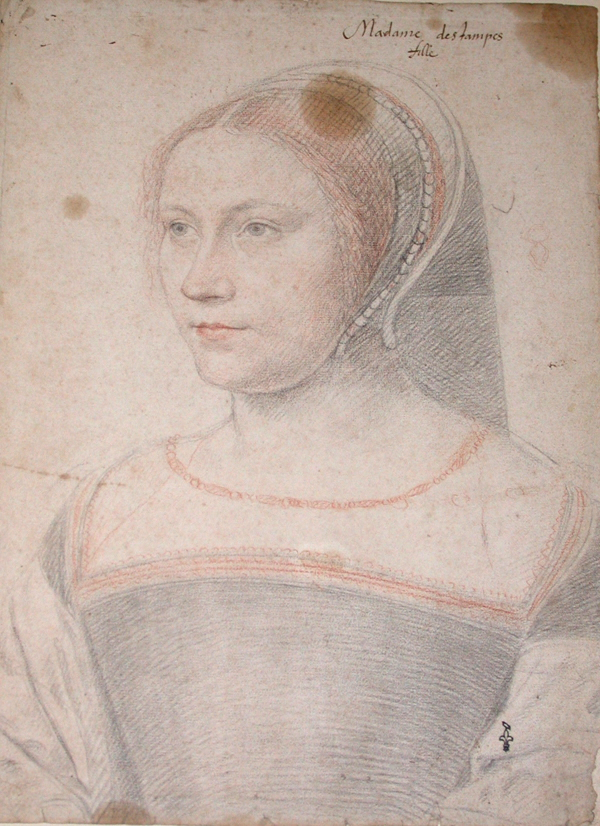
- Diane de Poitiers, Jean Clouet, 1525
- Born: 9 January 1500; Château de Saint-Vallier, Dauphiné, France
- Died: 25 April 1566 (aged 66); Anet, Normandy, France
- Buried: Château d'Anet, Eure-et-Loir, France
- Spouses: Louis de Brézé, Seigneur d'Anet (m. 1515; died 1531)
- Issue: Françoise de Brézé; Louise de Brézé
- Father: Jean de Poitiers, Seigneur de Saint Vallier
- Mother: Jeanne de Batarnay

Diane de Poitiers (9 January 1500 – 25 April 1566) was a French noblewoman and courtier who wielded much power and influence as royal mistress of Henry II of France until his death. Her position increased her wealth and family's status. She was a major patron of French Renaissance architecture.

== Early life ==
Diane de Poitiers was born on 9 January 1500, in the Château de Saint-Vallier. (Note: Kathleen Wellman states there is no exact record of Diane's actual birthdate, but references 9 January 1500.) Her parents were Jean de Poitiers and Jeanne de Batarnay. She was athletic, and frequently went riding and swimming for exercise.

When still a girl, Diane was briefly in the retinue of Princess Anne de Beaujeu, King Charles VIII's eldest sister who skillfully held the regency of France during his minority. Like her fellow charges, Diane was educated according to the principles of Renaissance humanism, including Greek and Latin, rhetoric, etiquette, finance, law, and architecture.

== Marriage ==
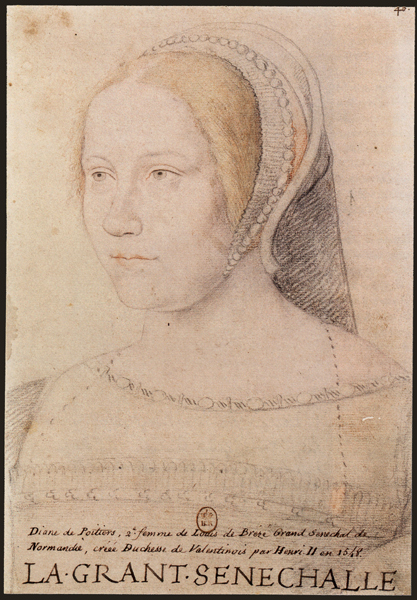
Anonymous sketch of Diane de Poitiers after a 1525 original

On 29 March 1515, at the age of 15, Diane was married to Louis de Brézé, seigneur d'Anet, Count of Maulévrier, and Grand Seneschal of Normandy, who was 39 years her senior. He was a grandson of King Charles VII by his mistress Agnès Sorel and served as a courtier to King Francis I. By Louis, Diane had two daughters, Françoise (1518–1574) and Louise (1521–1577).

Shortly after her marriage, Diane became lady-in-waiting to Queen Claude of France. After the Queen died, she served in the same capacity to Louise of Savoy, the King's mother, and then to Francis' second wife, Eleanor of Austria.

In 1523, her husband uncovered a plot against the King by the Constable of France, Charles III de Bourbon, unaware that his father-in-law was also involved. Jean de Poitiers was accused of treason and in 1524 sentenced to death, but this sentence was commuted. He was instead confined to prison until the signing of the Treaty of Madrid in 1526.

After her husband died in 1531 in Anet, Diane adopted the habit of wearing black and white for the rest of her life. They were among the permitted colours of mourning and the symbolic colours of the sides of the moon, playing on her name which derived from the Roman moon goddess. She commissioned sculptor Jean Goujon to build a tomb for Louis in the Cathedral of Rouen.

Diane's keen interest in financial matters and legal acumen became apparent for the first time during this period. She managed to retain her late husband's emoluments as grand seneschal of Normandy and challenged in court the obligation to return the family's appanages to the royal domain. Impressed, King Francis I allowed the widowed Diane to manage her inherited estates without the supervision of a male guardian and keep their considerable revenues.

== Royal favourite ==
The emblem of Diane de Poitiers, three interlaced crescents

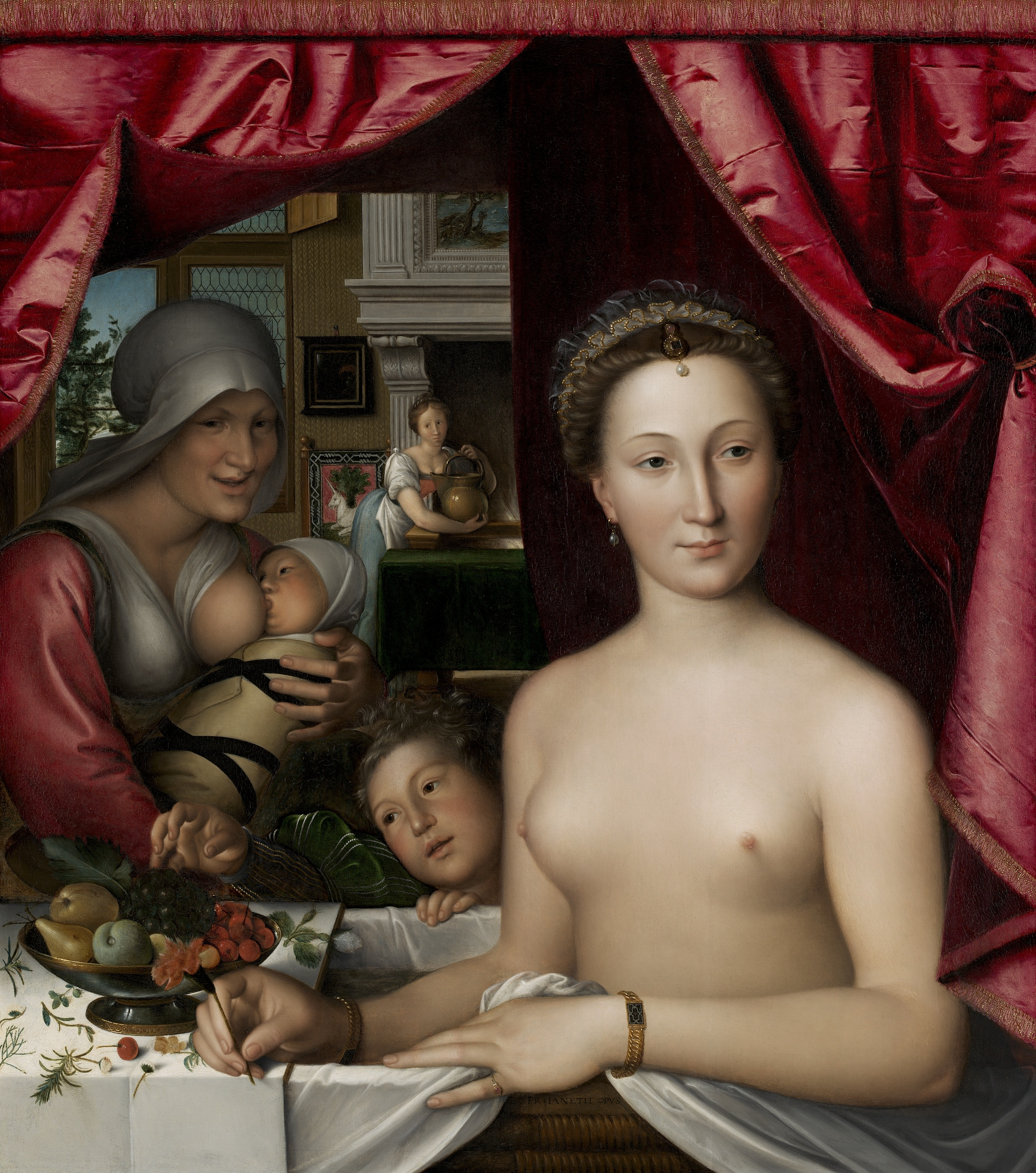
The painting A Lady in Her Bath by François Clouet possibly depicts either Diane de Poitiers or Mary, Queen of Scots. A noted beauty, Diane maintained her good looks well into her fifties and was immortalized in both sculpture and paintings. She sat for other paintings of the time, often topless or nude, other times in traditional poses.

In 1526, the princes Francis and Henry were sent to Spain as hostages for their father who had been captured by Imperial troops at the battle of Pavia in 1525 and imprisoned in Spain. Because their ransom was not paid, the two boys (eight and seven at the time) spent nearly four years isolated in a succession of ever-bleaker castles. This experience may account for the strong impression that Diane made on Henry as the very embodiment of the ideal gentlewoman: his mother being already dead, it was Diane, his grandmother's lady-in-waiting who gave him his farewell kiss when he was sent to Spain. At the tournament held in 1531 for the coronation of Francis's new wife, Eleanor of Austria, the Dauphin Francis wore the colours of the new Queen as expected, but Henry wore Diane's colours.

In 1533, Henry married Catherine de' Medici despite domestic opposition to the alliance, since the Medicis were no more than merchant upstarts in the eyes of many in the French court. However, Diane approved of the choice of bride, to whom she was related (Catherine's maternal grandfather and Diane's paternal grandmother were siblings, making Diane and Catherine second cousins). Based on allusions in their correspondence, it is generally believed that Diane became Henry's mistress in 1534, when she was 35 years old and Henry was 15.

In the early years of their marriage, Henry and Catherine had been childless and Diane became concerned, once Henry became heir to the throne following the death of his elder brother in 1536, of a possible repudiation of the royal wife that she had in her control, so she made sure that Henry's visits to the marital bedroom would be frequent (in the end, the royal couple had ten children). In another act of self-preservation toward the royal family, Diane helped nurse Catherine back to health when she fell ill.

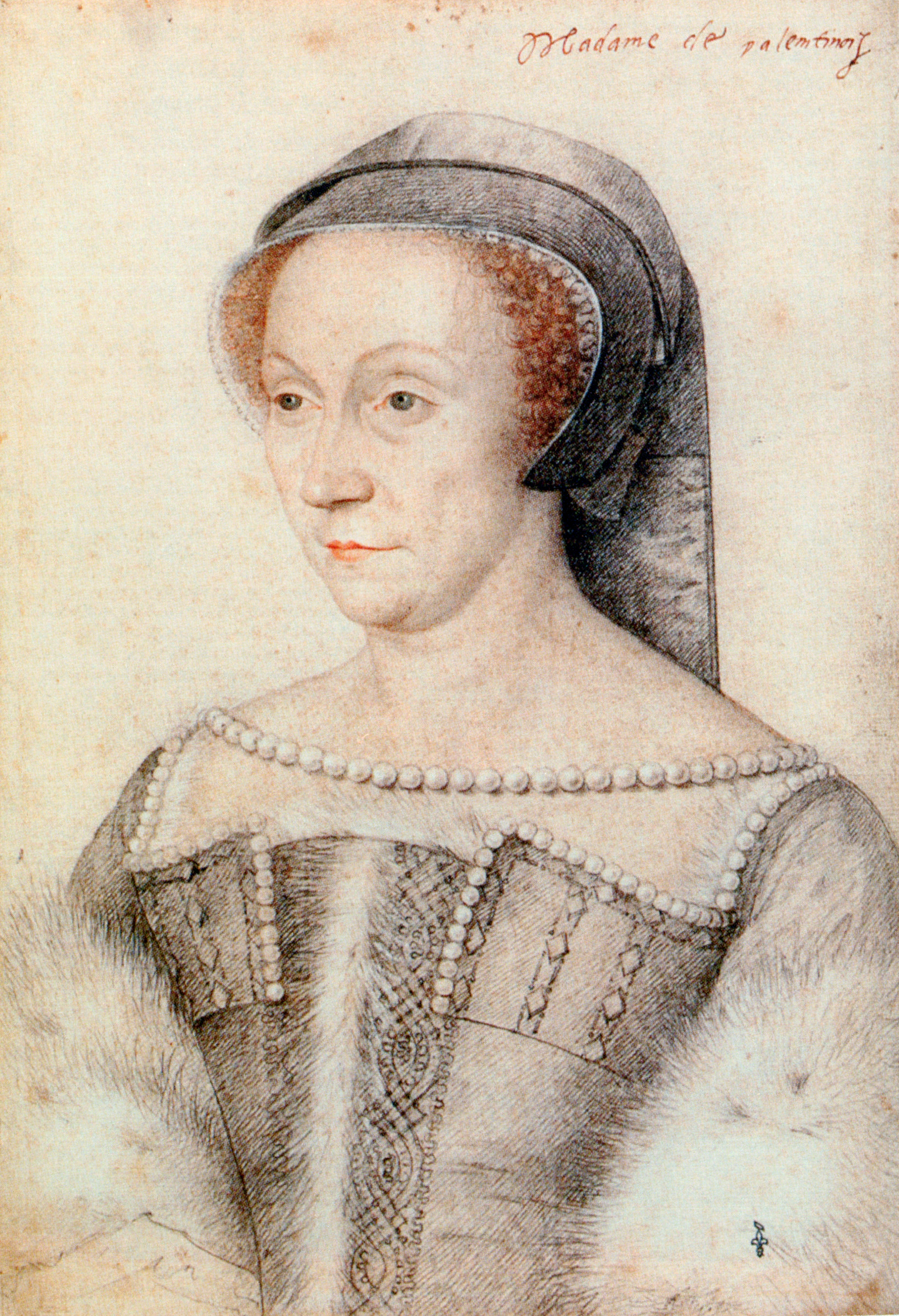
Diane de Poitiers, François Clouet, 1555

Despite his occasional affairs with other women, such as Philippa Duci, Janet Fleming, and Nicole de Savigny, Diane remained Henry's lifelong companion. For the next 25 years, she was one of the most powerful women in France.

When Francis I was still alive, Diane had to contend at the court with the enmity of his mistress, Anne de Pisseleu d'Heilly.

In 1544, Anne convinced Francis I that Henry (now the Dauphin) and Diane were working to reinstate Constable Montmorency at court (Montmorency, a favourite of Henry, had been in disgrace with the King ever since the collapse of negotiations with Emperor Charles V over the future of the Duchy of Milan: Charles had withdrawn his promise to grant the duchy to Francis' third son, the Duc d'Angoulême, for which Francis blamed Montmorency). When Francis banished Diane from court as a result of these accusations, Henry and his supporters retreated to Diane's chateau at Anet; father and son would not reconcile until 1545.

After Francis's death in 1547, Henry had Anne banned from court and confiscated her Duchy of Étampes. By then, Diane's position in the Court was such that when Pope Paul III sent the new Queen the "Golden Rose", he also presented the royal mistress with a pearl necklace. She received the prestigious title of Duchess of Valentinois in 1548 and was made Duchess of Étampes in 1553. Through the extensive patron-client network she cultivated, her sons-in-law received important positions.

Although she was not openly involved in politics, Diane's sharp intellect, confident maturity and loyalty to Henry II made her his most dependable ally in the court. He trusted her to write many of his official letters, which were signed jointly with the one name: "HenriDiane". Until 1551, she was in charge of the education of Henry and Catherine's children, and gave orders to their governors, Jean and Françoise d'Humières. Diane also took care of raising Diane of France (1538 - 1619), natural daughter of Henry and Filippa Ducci, whom she treated as if she were her own, to the point that some contemporary chroniclers wrote that Diane was actually the biological mother of the girl. Her daughter Françoise managed the Queen's household as première dame d'honneur (chief lady-in-waiting).

The King's adoration for Diane caused a great deal of jealousy on the part of Queen Catherine, particularly when Henry entrusted Diane with the Crown Jewels of France and gave her the Château de Chenonceau, a piece of royal property that Catherine had wanted for herself. However, as long as the King lived, the Queen was powerless to do anything about it.

== Construction projects ==
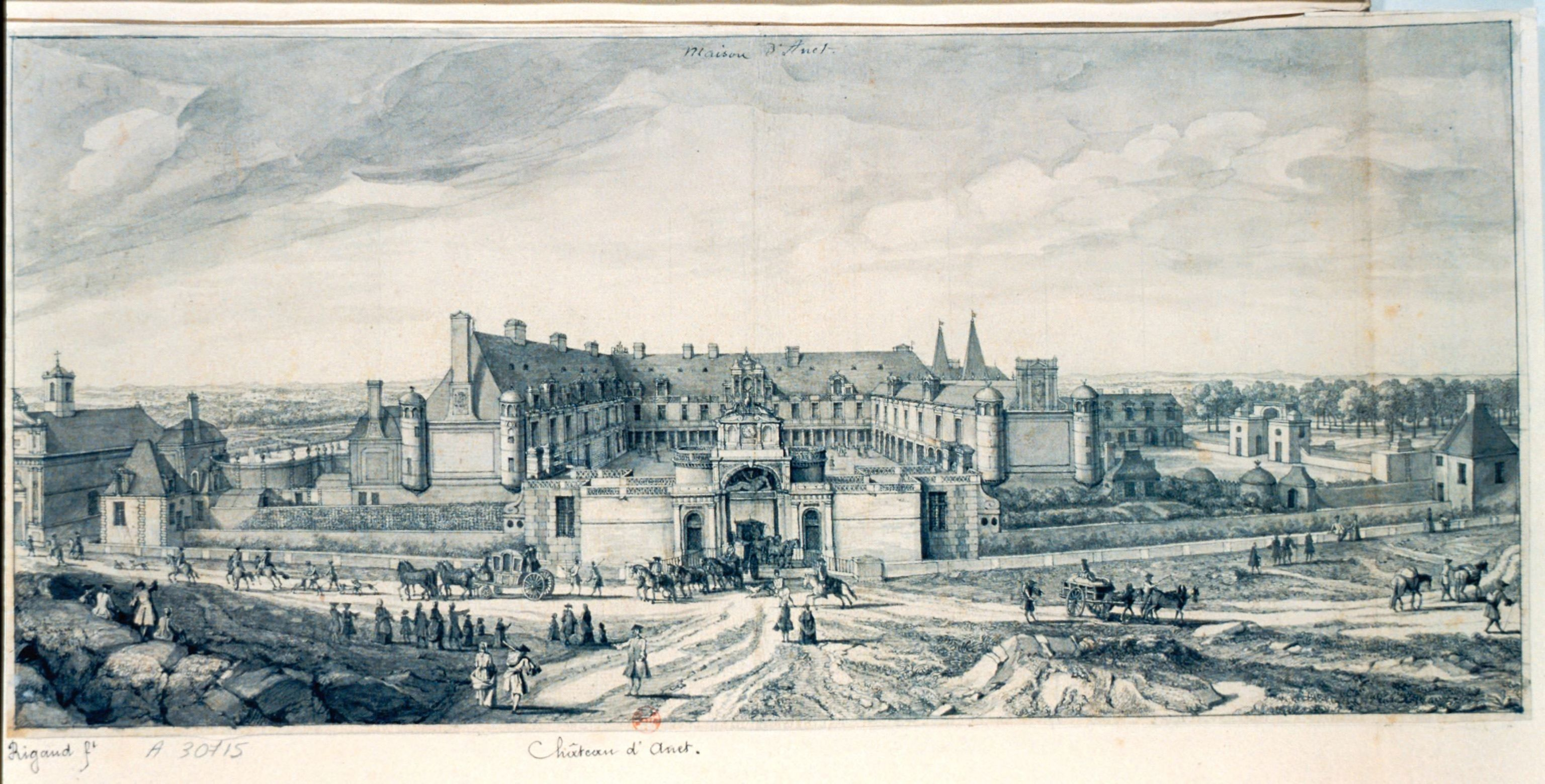
Diane's home, Anet, in the 18th century

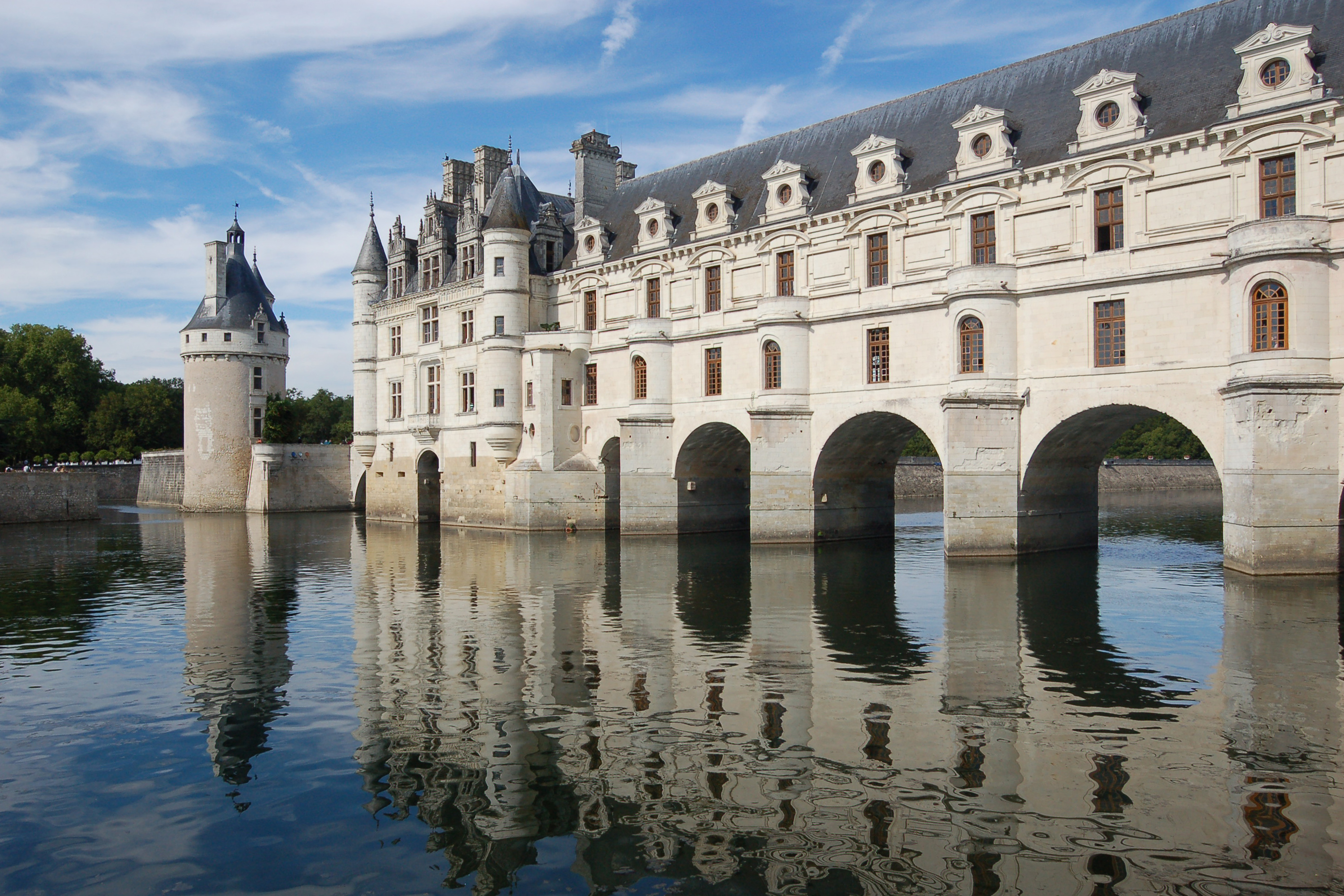
The Château de Chenonceau on the river Cher. Diane financed and built its bridge.

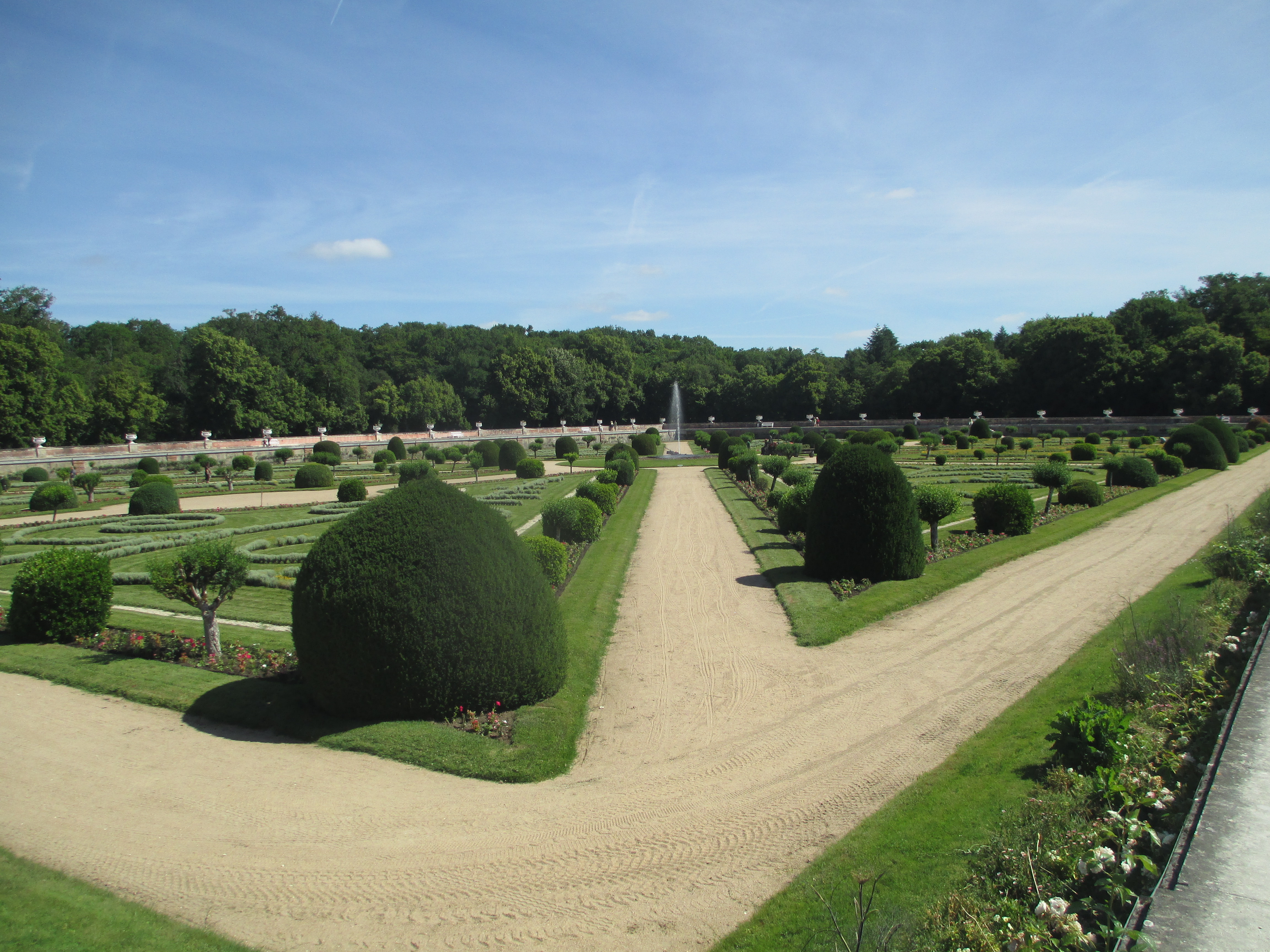
Diane de Poitiers' garden

Most of the sources in Diane's hand are accounts, demonstrating her meticulous attention to finances. She profited from the confiscation of Anne de Pisseleu's estates and managed the lands well, to the point where she became the beneficiary of 300,000 écus. One of the most successful royal mistresses in acquiring wealth, Diane used her income to build castles by commissioning architect Philibert de l'Orme. Making strikingly effective use of Renaissance arts and rhetoric, she constructed an image of herself as a paragon of virtue and presented the image of Henry II as a model of chivalry.

Diane supervised the remodeling of Château d'Anet, her late husband's feudal castle of stone. It has a porch with widely spaced paired ionic columns between towers crowned by pyramidal spires. The château is noted for its exterior, notably the Fountain of Diana, in which the mistress represented the goddess reclining with her two dogs and stag. There is the mortuary chapel built according to Diane's wishes to contain her tomb, commissioned from architect Claude de Foucques by her daughter Louise, Duchess of Aumale.

Although its ownership remained with the crown until 1555, Diane was the unquestioned mistress of Château de Chenonceau, the jewel of the Loire Renaissance palaces. In 1555, she asked de l'Orme to build the arched bridge joining the château to its opposite bank and oversaw the planting of extensive gardens filled with varieties of fruit trees. Set along the banks of the river, her exquisite gardens were famous and copied.

== Later years ==
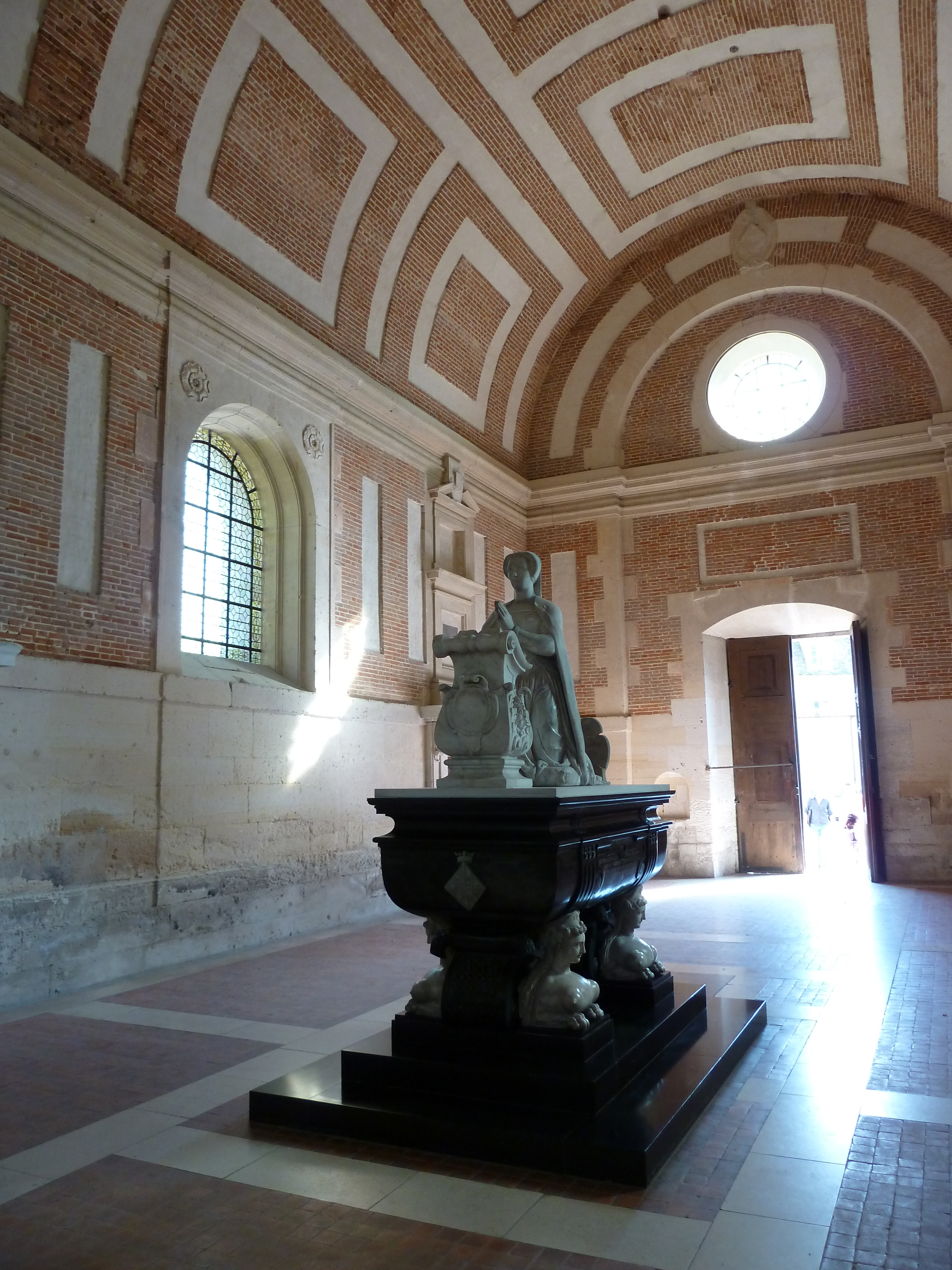
Diane's tomb in the chapel at the Château d'Anet

Despite wielding such power over the court, Diane's status depended on the King's welfare and his remaining in power. In 1559, Henry was severely wounded in a jousting tournament - his lance wore Diane's favour (ribbon), rather than his wife's - a wound that would soon prove fatal. Queen Catherine soon assumed control, restricting access to the royal chambers. In the (ten) days before his death, Henry was alleged to have called out repeatedly for Diane, but she was not admitted to his deathbed nor invited, as was custom and tradition, to his funeral. With Henry now dead and Catherine Queen Mother, Diane was immediately obliged by her royal rival to exchange the Château de Chenonceau for the less attractive Château de Chaumont; a punishment much less severe, however, than ones suffered by other royal mistresses.

Diane lived out her remaining years in her château in Anet, where she lived in comfortable obscurity as a virtual exile. At the age of 64, she suffered a fall during a ride from which she never fully recovered and died a year later. In accordance with Diane's wishes and to provide a resting place for her, her daughter completed the funeral chapel, built near the castle.

During the French Revolution, her tomb was opened, her corpse desecrated, and her remains thrown into a mass grave. In 1866, Georges Guiffrey published her correspondence. When French experts exhumed her remains in 2009, they found high levels of gold in her hair. It is suggested that the "drinkable gold" that she "reportedly" regularly took, believed to preserve youth, may have ultimately killed her. In May 2010, she was reburied at her original tomb in the Château d'Anet.

== In popular culture ==
=== Novels ===
- The Two Dianas, by Alexandre Dumas
- Courtesan, by Diane Haeger
- La Princesse de Clèves, by Madame de La Fayette
- The Devil's Queen: A Novel of Catherine de Medici, by Jeanne Kalogridis
- Queen's Play and Checkmate, by Dorothy Dunnett
- The Master of All Desires, by Judith Merkle Riley
- Mary Queen of Scots: Queen Without a Country, France, 1553, by Kathryn Lasky
- The Wild Queen: The Days and Nights of Mary, Queen of Scots, by Carolyn Meyer
- The Confessions of Catherine de Medici, by C.W. Gortner
- Royal Road to Fotheringhay and Madame Serpent, by Jean Plaidy
- The Serpent and the Moon, by Princess Michael of Kent (remote descendant of Diane de Poitiers)
- The Ruling Passion, by Alice Acland
- Rival Queens, The Betrayal of Mary, Queen of Scots, by historian Kate William
- Catherine de Medici: Renaissance Queen of France, by Leonie Frieda.

=== Films ===
- Diane (1956), portrayed by Lana Turner
- Nostradamus (1994), portrayed by Diana Quick

=== Television ===
- Reign (2013), portrayed by Anna Walton
- Horrible Histories (2013), portrayed by Martha Howe-Douglas
- The Serpent Queen (2022), portrayed by Ludivine Sagnier
- The King's Favorite (Diane de Poitiers) (2022), portrayed by Isabelle Adjani

== See also ==
- List of French royal mistresses
- Fountain of Diana

== Sources ==
- Baumgartner, Frederic J. (1988). Henry II: King of France 1547–1559. Duke University Press.
- Brown, Cynthia Jane, ed. (2010). The Cultural and Political Legacy of Anne de Bretagne: Negotiating. D.S. Brewer.
- Carroll, Stuart (1998). Noble Power During the French Wars of Religion: The Guise Affinity and the Catholic Cause in Normandy. Cambridge University Press.
- Carroll, Stuart (2009). Martyrs and Murderers: The Guise Family and the Making of Europe. Oxford University Press.
- Knecht, R.J. (2016). Hero or Tyrant? Henry III, King of France, 1574-89. Routledge.
- Wellman, Kathleen (2013). Queens and Mistresses of Renaissance France. Yale University Press.
