= Jean Goujon =

French sculptor

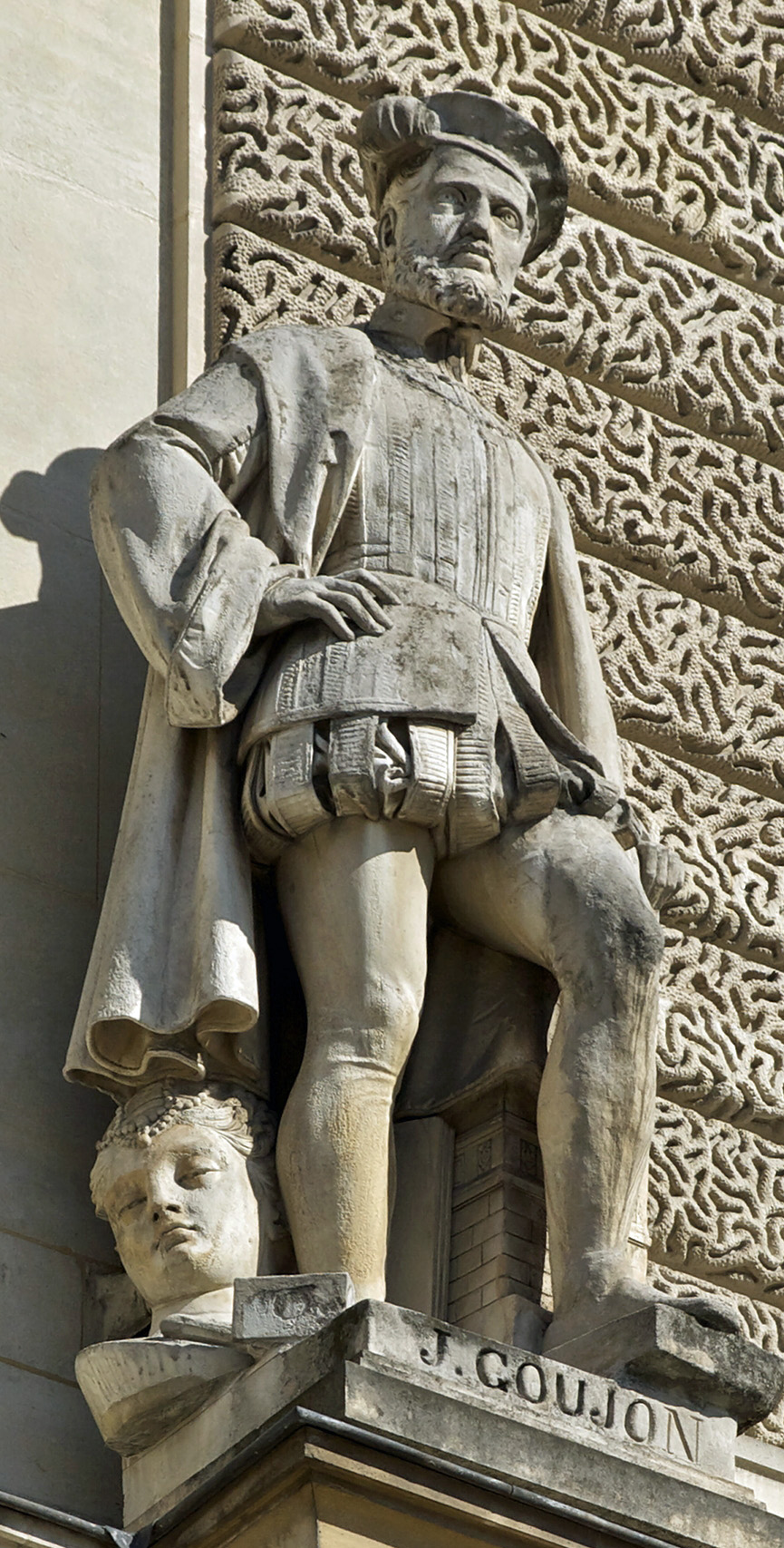
- Statue of Jean Goujon by Bernard Seurre, located on the exterior of the Louvre
- Born: c. 1510 probably Normandy
- Died: c. 1565, ~55 years old probably Bologna
- Known for: sculptor, architect
- Notable work: Fountain of the Innocents, Caryatids of the Louvre

Jean Goujon (French pronunciation: [ʒɑ̃ ɡuʒɔ̃]; c. 1510 – c. 1565) was a French Renaissance sculptor and architect.

== Biography ==
His early life is little known; he was probably born in Normandy and may have traveled in Italy. He worked at the church of Saint-Maclou, his earliest documented work, and the Rouen Cathedral, in 1541-42, where he executed the monument to Louis de Brézé, seigneur d'Anet, before arriving in Paris, where he collaborated with the architect Pierre Lescot at the church of Saint-Germain-l'Auxerrois about 1544, working on the pulpit, which was dismantled in the mid-eighteenth century. In 1544-1547 he was occupied with considerable works at the Château d’Ecouen for the connétable de Montmorency. He became "sculptor to the king" (Henry II of France) in 1547 and in the next years was occupied at the Château of Anet. He was then imprisoned at Ecouen in 1555.

His most famous works are the sculptural decorations made in collaboration with Lescot for the western extension of the Louvre, 1555-62. A fine representative of Mannerism in France, Goujon's figures are elongated, sensual and fluid; his drapery work reveals knowledge of Greek sculpture, though certainly not at first hand. He is also responsible for engravings for Jean Martin's 1547 translation of Vitruvius and for work on the Château of Ecouen, for the Montmorency family. In 1562, Goujon left France for religious reasons (he was a Huguenot).

The purity and gracefulness of his style were disseminated throughout France by engravings by artists of the School of Fontainebleau and had an influence in the decorative arts. His reputation was slightly eclipsed at the end of the century by more mannered tendencies, but was appreciated by French Classicism.

Goujon was a Protestant; he escaped the French Wars of Religion by exiling himself in Italy in 1562. He probably died in Bologna, where he is last documented in 1563 as a member of a group of Huguenot refugees.

== Works ==
His most famous works include:

- Fountain of the Innocents (1547–1550) - Goujon sculpted the six nymphs that decorate this public fountain designed by Pierre Lescot. The fountain is currently located - in a much truncated form - in the Les Halles section of Paris; original bas-reliefs are located at the Louvre
- Caryatids (1550–1551) - for the musician's platform in the Louvre, these are highly reminiscent of the Erechtheum in Athens.
- Allegories on the facade of the Louvre (1549-155) - these are found in the Cour Carrée (or "square courtyard") of the Louvre
- The Four Seasons (illustrations) made for the courtyard façade of the hôtel of Jacques de Ligeris, now housing the Musée Carnavalet, Paris.

To Goujon is usually attributed the engravings of the French version of Francesco Colonna's Songe de Poliphile (1546), based on the engravings of the original edition (which may be due to the studio of Mantegna).

The famous Fountain of Diana (Diana with a Stag) (c. 1549) Louvre, designed for Diane de Poitiers for the Château d'Anet, was long believed to be by Goujon or his workshop. It is now thought more likely to have been the work of Germain Pilon.

== Gallery ==
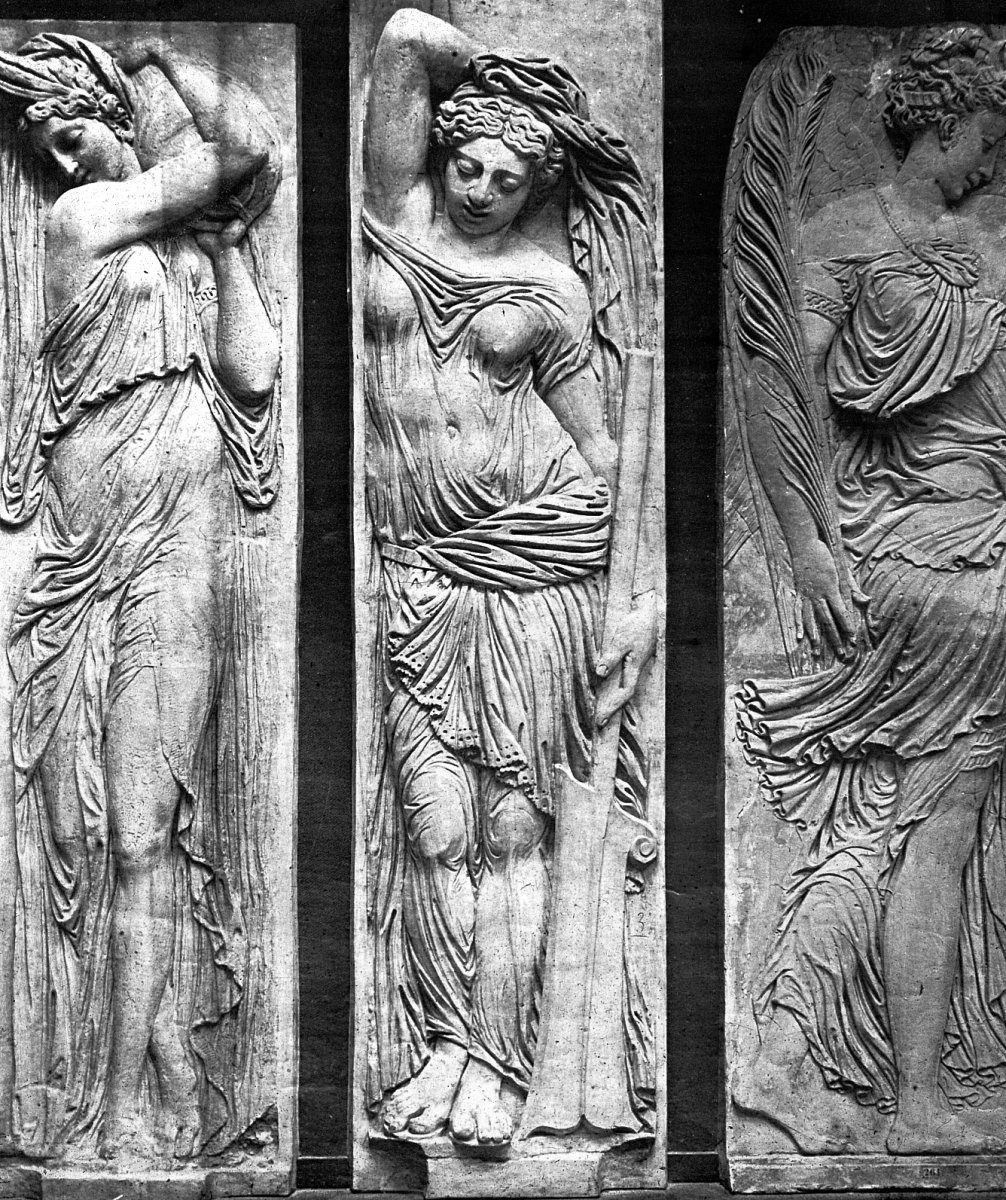
Stone reliefs of nymphs
from the Fontaine des Innocents

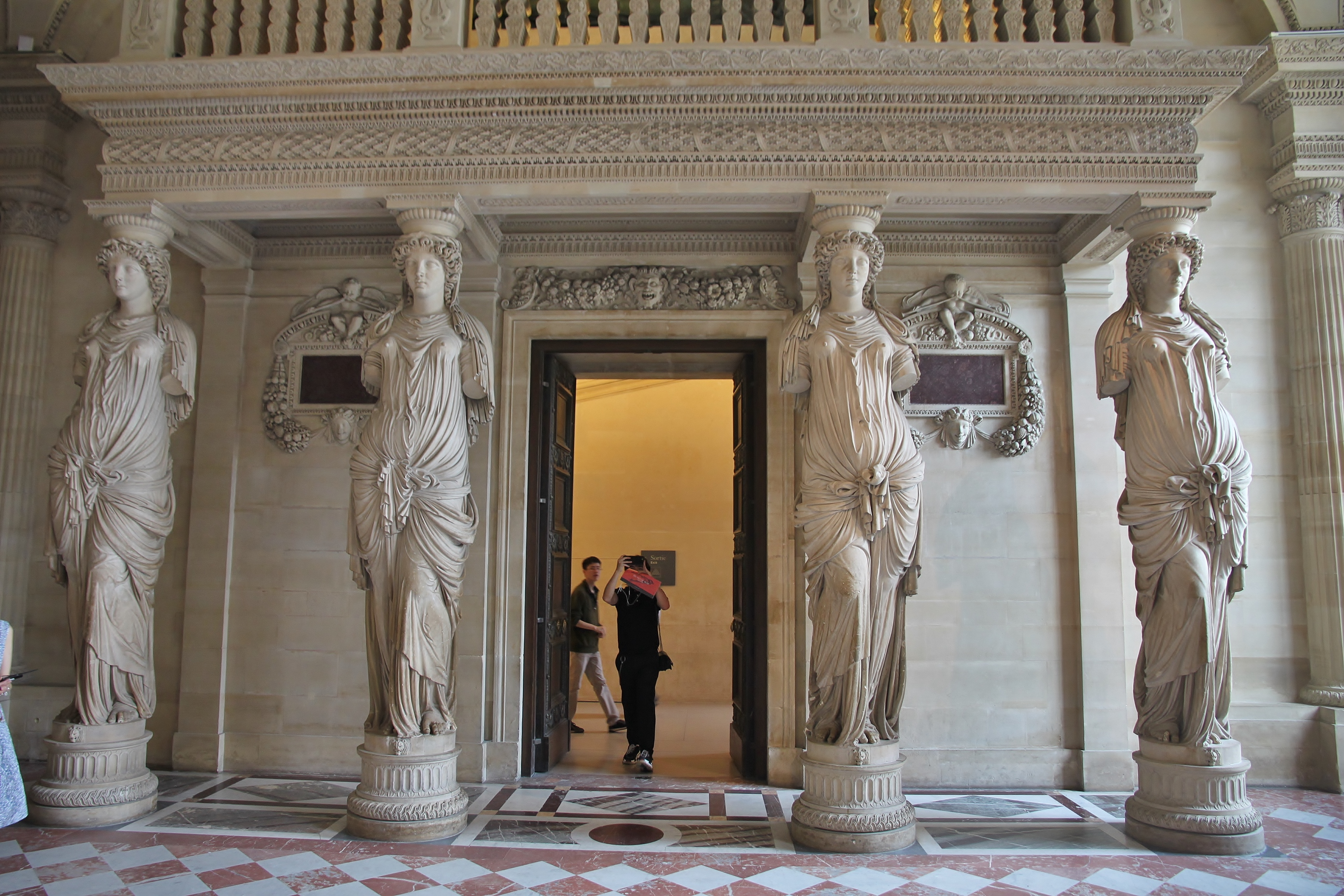
Caryatides, Salle des Caryatides at the Louvre (1550–51)

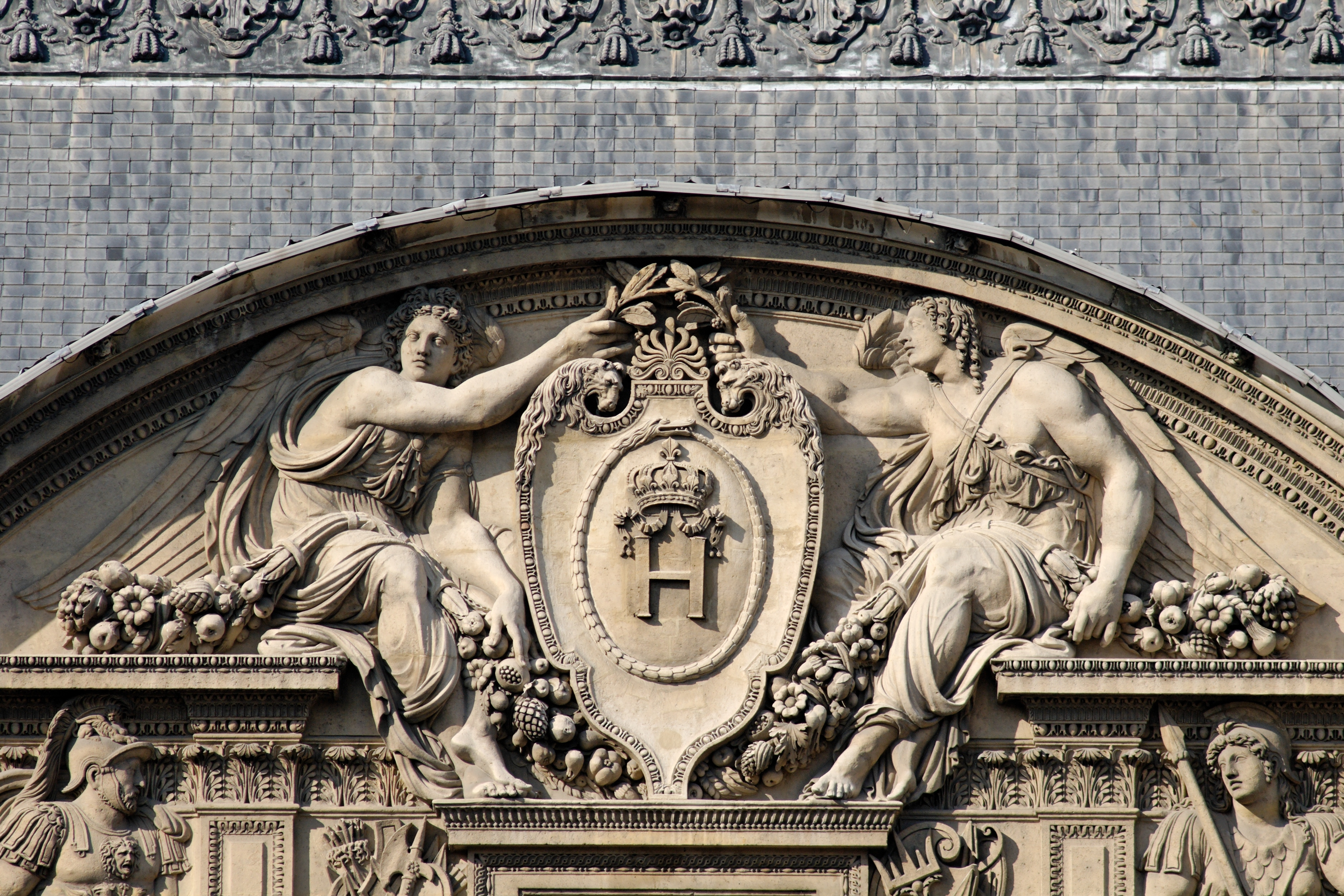
Allegory of War, central pediment of the Lescot Wing of the Louvre

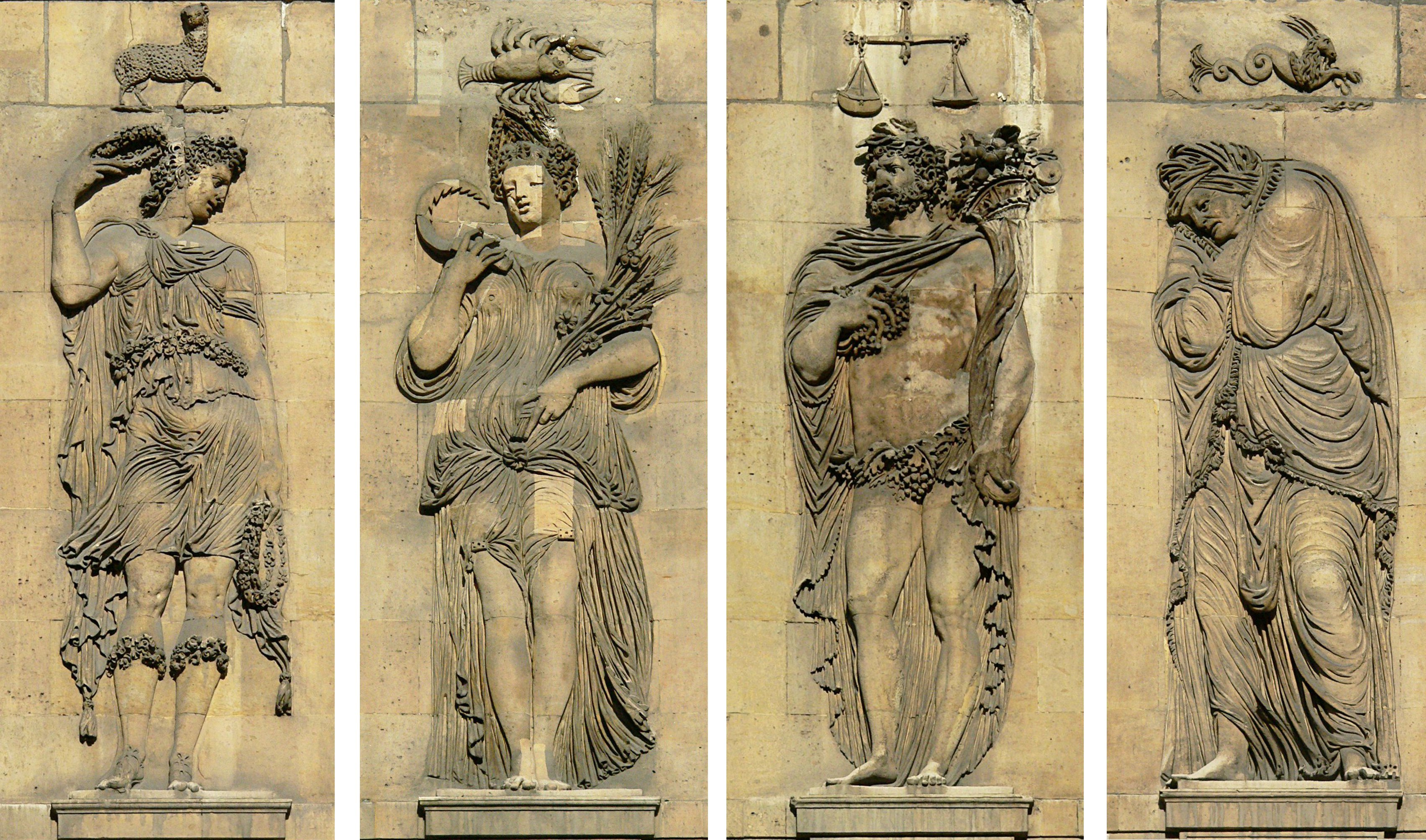
The Four Seasons (c.1547)
Musée Carnavalet, Paris

== See also ==
- French art
- French sculpture
