= Jacques de Brézé =

French writer (c. 1440–1494)

Jacques de Brézé (c.1440 - Nogent-le-Roi, 1494) was Grand Seneschal of Normandy (1465–1476 and 1483–1490), Count of Maulévrier, Viscount of Le Bec-Crespin and Marny, Lord of Anet and a French writer of the 15th century.

== Life ==
He was the only son of Pierre de Brézé, also Seneschal of Normandy, and Jeanne du Bec-Crespin.

He married Charlotte de Valois, a daughter of King Charles VII and his mistress Agnès Sorel. On the night of 31 May to 1 June 1477, he surprised his wife in the act of adultery with his friend Pierre de Lavergne at the Château de Rouvres, and killed the two lovers with his sword. He was sentenced to death but was pardoned in return for a considerable fine, which ruined him financially.

In 1484, after the death of King Louis XI, he regained his property and title of Seneschal of Normandy by decree of the Parlement.

By Charlotte of Valois, James had six children:

- Pierre, no issue
- Louis, who succeeded him in the titles and who married Diana of Poitiers, favorite mistress of Henry II
- Jean, no issue
- Anne, married Georges, baron de Clères
- Catherine, no issue
- Gaston, married Marie de Cerisay, daughter of Christophe de Cerisay

He also had three illegitimate sons.

== Works ==
Jacques de Brézé was also a writer and was the author of:

- Louanges de Madame Anne de France , a poem dedicated to Anne de Beaujeu, regent of France
- La chasse , a hunting poem
- Dits du bon chien Souillard (c. 1490), a delicate poem dedicated to his dog
