= Agnès Sorel =

Royal mistress of Charles VII of France

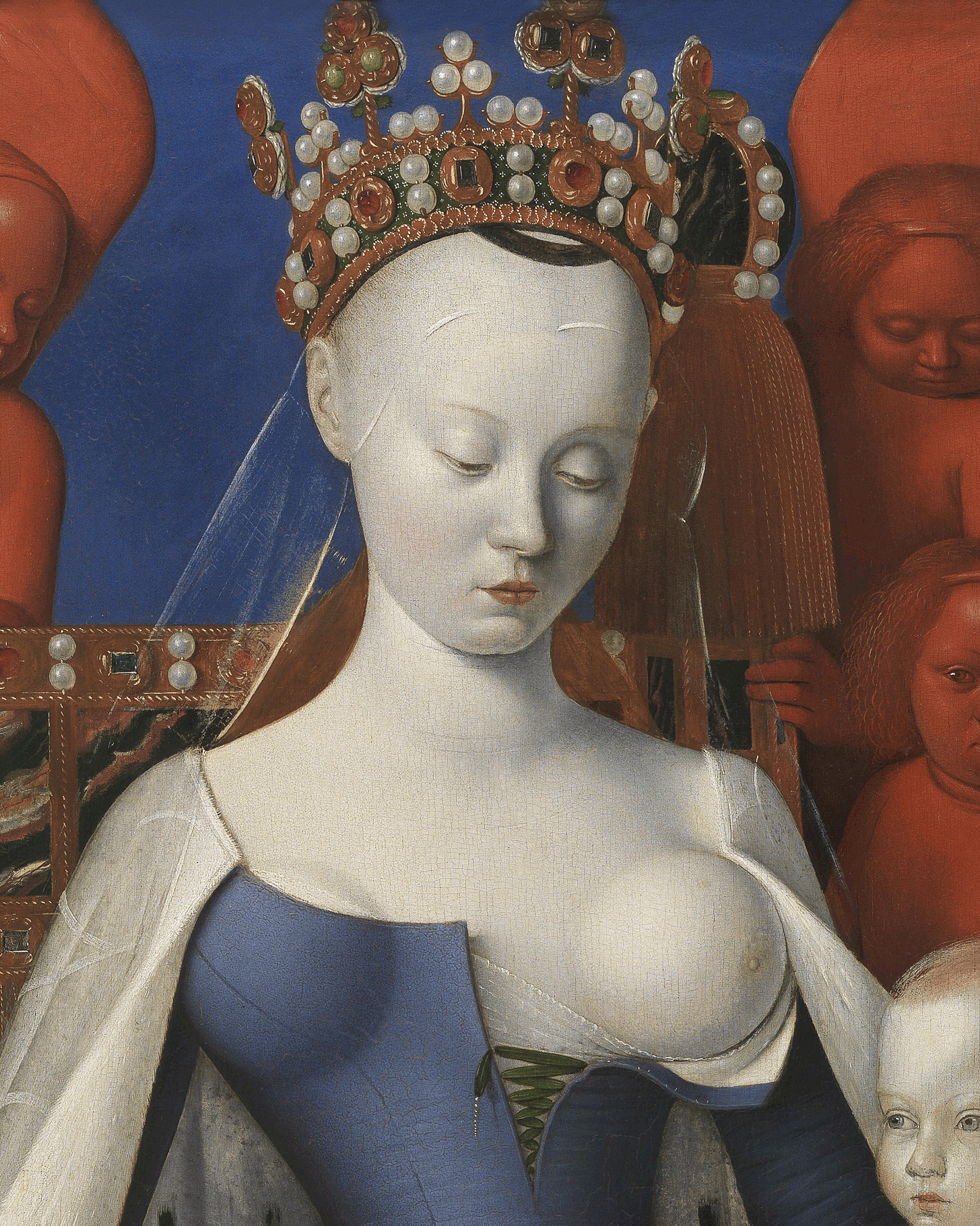
- Agnès Sorel as Madonna Lactans
- Born: 1422; Fromenteau (Yzeures sur Creuse), Touraine, France
- Died: 9 February 1450 (aged 28); Jumièges, Normandy, France
- Occupation: Maid of honour
- Known for: Royal mistress
- Partner: Charles VII of France
- Children: Marie de Valois; Charlotte de Valois; Jeanne de Valois
- Parents: Jean Soreau; Catherine de Maignelais

Agnès Sorel (French: [aɲɛs sɔʁɛl]; 1422 – 9 February 1450), known by the sobriquet Dame de beauté (Lady of Beauty), was a favourite and chief mistress of King Charles VII of France, by whom she bore four daughters. She is considered the first officially recognized royal mistress of a French king. She was the subject of several contemporary paintings and works of art, including Jean Fouquet's Virgin and Child Surrounded by Angels.

== Life in the royal court ==
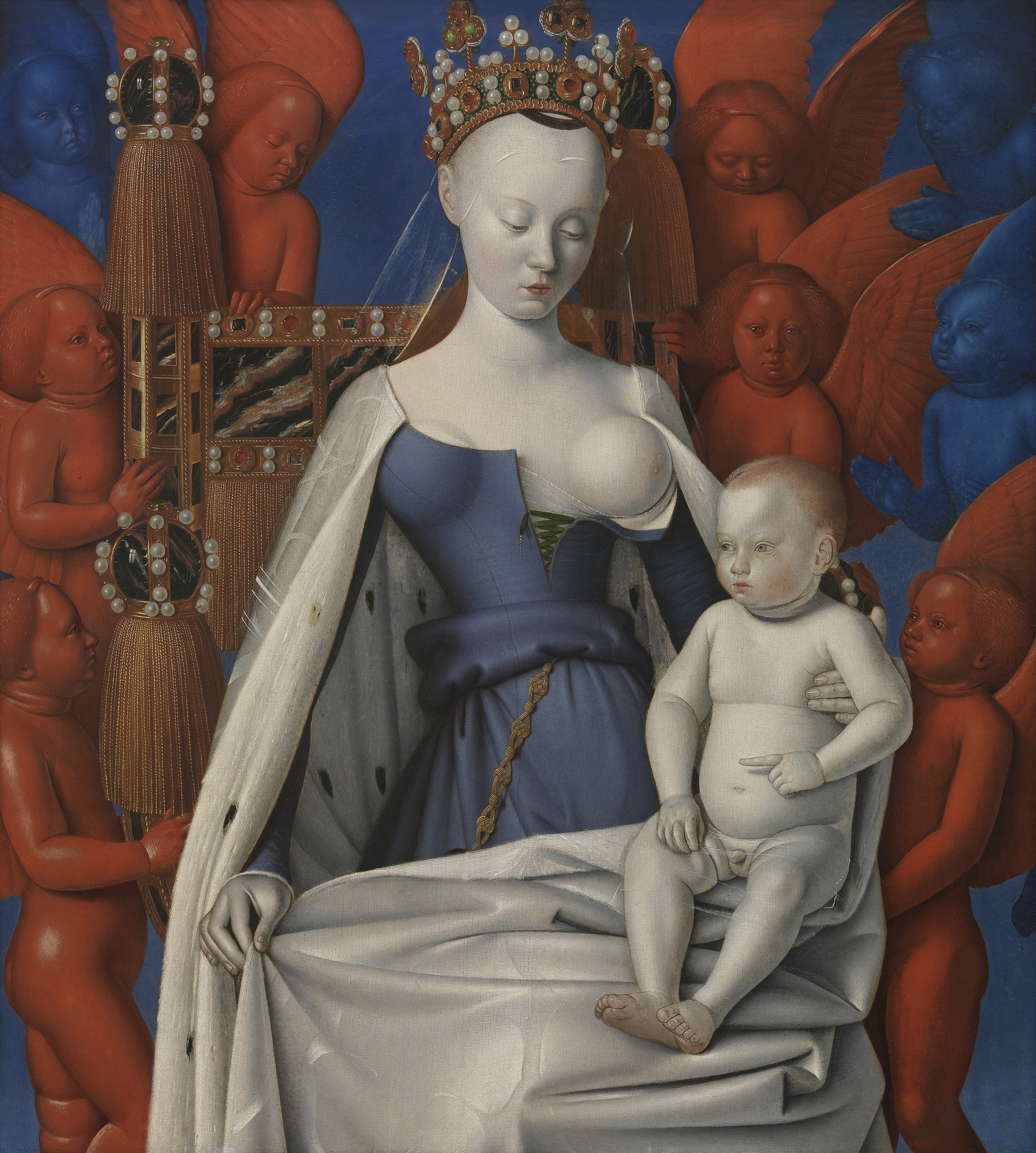
Right wing of the Melun Diptych: Virgin and Child Surrounded by Angels (depiction of Sorel by Jean Fouquet)

Born in 1422, Agnes was the daughter of Jean Soreau, Châtelain of Coudun, and his wife Catherine de Maignelais. She was 20 or 21 years old when she was introduced to King Charles. At that time, Agnes was holding a position in the household of Rene I of Naples, as a maid of honour to his consort Isabella, Duchess of Lorraine. She then went on to serve as the lady-in-waiting for Marie d'Anjou, Charles VII's wife and Isabella's sister in law. Agnes would soon become his mistress. The King gave her the Château de Loches (where he had been persuaded by Joan of Arc to be crowned King of France) as her private residence.

Soon, Agnes' presence was felt at the royal court in Chinon where her company was alleged to have brought the king out of a protracted depression. Her influence on the court was first felt when she succeeded in convincing the poor king to rally his troops and drive English invaders from French soil. Agnes had a very strong influence on the king, and that, in addition to her extravagant tastes, earned her powerful enemies at court. She would become the first officially recognized royal mistress of a French king.

Agnes generated scandal at court, particularly for popularizing the fashion of low-cut gowns. This behavior was both imitated and scorned. Jean Juvénal des Ursins, the archbishop of Reims, counseled the king to correct such fashions as "front openings through which one sees the teats, nipples, and breasts of women" (ouvertures de par devant, par lesquelles on voit les tetins, tettes et seins des femmes).

Further scandal was brought to court when painter Jean Fouquet used her in his painting, the Melun Diptych, which depicted Agnes as the Mother of God. Courtiers were appalled that the king's mistress and the mother of Charles' illegitimate children was likened to Mary when her status was much less than holy.

== Children and death ==
Agnès gave birth to four daughters fathered by the king:

- Marie, possibly born the summer of 1444
- Charlotte, who married Jacques de Brézé (their son, Louis de Brézé, seigneur d'Anet, in turn married Diane de Poitiers, a future royal mistress)
- Jeanne

While pregnant with their fourth child, she journeyed from Chinon in midwinter to join Charles on the campaign of 1450 in Jumièges, wanting to be with him as moral support. There, she suddenly became ill, and after giving birth, she and her daughter died on 9 February 1450. She was 28 years old. While the cause of death was originally thought to be dysentery, in 2005 French forensic scientist Philippe Charlier stated that Agnès died of mercury poisoning. Whether or not the poisoning was deliberate remains unknown. Mercury was sometimes used in cosmetic preparations or to treat worms, and such use might have brought about her death. She was interred in the Church of St. Ours, in Loches. Her heart was buried in the Benedictine Abbey of Jumièges.

Charles' son, the future Louis XI, had been in open revolt against his father for the previous four years. It has been speculated that he had Agnès poisoned in order to remove what he may have considered her undue influence over the king. It was also speculated that French financier, noble, and minister Jacques Cœur poisoned her, though that assertion is widely discredited as having been an attempt to remove Cœur from the French court.

Her cousin Antoinette de Maignelais took her place as mistress to the king after her death.

== Legacy ==
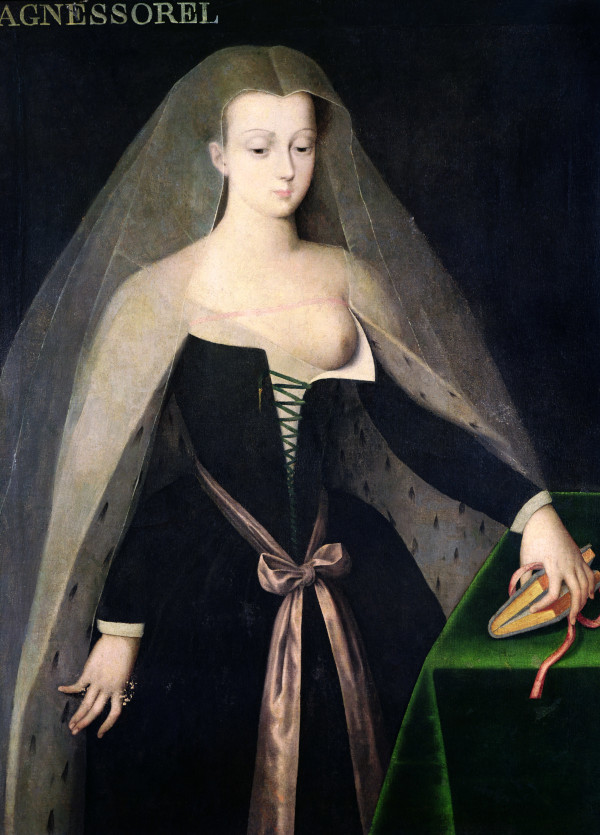
A 16th-century portrait after Jean Fouquet's Virgin and Child

Sorel plays a main part in Voltaire's poem La Pucelle. She is the subject of an 1836 opera named after her. Two Russian operas from the late 19th century also portray her, along with Charles VII: Pyotr Tchaikovsky's The Maid of Orleans and César Cui's The Saracen.

She is also a featured figure on Judy Chicago's installation piece The Dinner Party, being represented as one of the 999 names on the Heritage Floor. Two garments use Sorel's name in their descriptors, Agnes Sorel bodice, Agnes Sorel corsage and a fashion style named after her as well, Agnes Sorel style, which is described as a "princess" style of dressing.

== See also ==
- List of unsolved deaths

== Sources ==
- Charlier, Philippe (14 February 2006). "Europe, Joan of Arc 'relics' to be tested". BBC News.
- Cumming, Valerie; Cunnington, C. W.; Cunnington, P. E. (2017). The Dictionary of Fashion History. London: Bloomsbury Academic. ISBN 978-1-4725-7772-6. OCLC 1003266867. Partial preview at Google Books.
- Delany, Sheila (1998). Impolitic Bodies: Poetry, Saints, and Society in Fifteenth-Century England. New York: Oxford University Press. p. 108. ISBN 978-1-4294-0437-2. OCLC 252598021.
- Herman, Eleanor (2004). Sex With Kings: 500 Years of Adultery, Power, Rivalry, and Revenge. New York: Morrow. ISBN 978-0-06-175155-4. OCLC 1036946961.
- Le Maho, Jacques (2012). Jumieges Abbey. editions du patrimoine. ISBN 978-2-85822-397-8. OCLC 200441481.
- Monks, Peter Rolf (1990). The Brussels Horloge de Sapience: Iconography and Text of Brussels. Brill. ISBN 978-90-04-09088-0. OCLC 557254417 – via Internet Archive.
- Sackler, Elizabeth A. (2007). "Agnes Sorel". Elizabeth A. Sackler Center for Feminist Art: The Dinner Party: Heritage Floor:Agnes Sorel. Brooklyn Museum.
- Vale, Malcolm Graham Allan (1974). Charles the Seventh. London: Eyre Methuen. ISBN 978-0-413-28080-0. OCLC 1204460 – via Internet Archive.
- Wellman, Kathleen (2013). Queens and Mistresses of Renaissance France. Yale University Press. ISBN 978-0-300-19065-6. JSTOR j.ctt32bmdq.1. OCLC 841809754.
