= Charlotte de Brézé =

Illegitimate daughter of Charles VII of France

Charlotte de Valois
- Born: 1446
- Died: 1 June 1477 (aged 30–31); Rouvres, Eure-et-Loir
- Cause of death: Murder
- Buried: Benedictine abbey of Coulombs, Eure-et-Loir
- Noble family: Valois
- Spouse: Jacques de Brézé
- Issue: Louis de Brézé
- Father: Charles VII of France
- Mother: Agnès Sorel

Charlotte de Brézé (c. 1446–1477), also known as Charlotte de Valois, was an illegitimate daughter of Charles VII of France by Agnès Sorel. She was the sister of Marie de Valois (1444–1473) and Jeanne de Valois (b. 1448), and the half sister of Louis XI.

== Life ==
Despite the circumstances of her birth, Charlotte was said to be a great favourite of her father's wife queen Marie of Anjou.

On March 1, 1462, Charlotte married Jacques de Brézé, seneschal of Normandy and comte de Maulévrier, an arranged and politically expedient match. From this marriage were born five children, including Louis de Brézé, who would go on to marry as his second wife Diane de Poitiers, herself a mistress of Henry II of France.

Charlotte was murdered on the night of May 31/June 1, 1477, by her husband. He suspected her of having an affair with one of his huntsmen, Pierre de Lavergne. Charlotte was buried at the Benedictine abbey of Coulombs.

== Sources ==
- Durrieu, Paul (1922). "Les filles d'Agnès Sorel". Comptes rendus des séances de l'Académie des Inscriptions et Belles-Lettres (in French). 66–3: 150–168.
- Wellman, Kathleen (2013). Queens and Mistresses of Renaissance France. Yale University Press.
