= Louis de Brézé =

French noble (c.1460–1531)

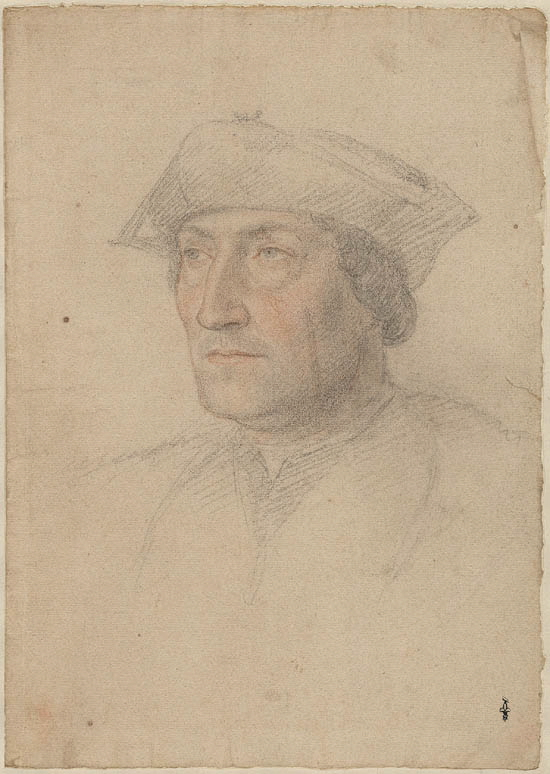
- Possible portrait of Louis de Brézé (school of Jean Clouet)
- Born: c. 1460
- Died: 23 July 1531 (aged 70–71)
- Resting place: Rouen, Upper Normandy, France
- Occupation: Nobleman
- Spouses: Catherine de Dreux (died 1512); Diane de Poitiers (m. 1515)
- Children: Several, including Françoise and Louise
- Parents: Jacques de Brézé (father); Charlotte de Valois (mother)
- Relatives: Charles VII of France (grandfather); Agnès Sorel (grandmother)

Louis de Brézé, Seigneur d'Anet and Count of Maulévrier (c. 1460 – 23 July 1531), was a French nobleman, the grandson of King Charles VII of France through his illegitimate daughter, born from his relationship with Agnès Sorel.

== Early life ==
Louis was the son of Jacques de Brézé, Sénéchal of Normandy, and Charlotte de Valois, the second of Charles VII's three illegitimate daughters by Agnès Sorel. His paternal grandfather was Pierre de Brézé, noted for valour at Formigny, a grand steward of Normandy.

== Career ==
In 1523, Louis uncovered a plot against King Francis I. He did not know at the time that his father-in-law, Jean de Poitiers, Seigneur de Saint Vallier, was involved in the plot. Jean was condemned to death over that involvement, but reprieved by the king due to his having no direct involvement.

Louis was influential at court, being named Sénéchal of Normandy and Master of the Hunt. His home was the family seat, the Château d'Anet, which stood in a royal hunting preserve in the valley of the Eure. He also inherited the Château du Bec-Crespin.

Before his death in 1531, Louis encouraged the marriage of Prince Henry to the Pope's great-niece, Catherine de' Medici, thus setting up the triangle that was to continue until Henry's death, with his widow, Diane de Poitiers, becoming Henry's mistress. For Diane, King Henry II rebuilt the old Château d'Anet, which became one of the first French Renaissance châteaus, and she would be entrusted with much of the management of royal court business.

== Personal life ==
Louis' first wife was Catherine de Dreux. Later, he married Diane de Poitiers on 29 March 1515; she was 15, and he 39 years older. Together, they had:

- Françoise de Brézé, (b. 1518) married Robert IV de La Marck.
- Louise de Brézé, (b. 1521) married Claude, Duke of Aumale

Louis died on 23 July 1531. It has been expressly stated in an old Norman manuscript, that his bowels were interred at Anet, his heart in the abbey of Coulombs near his father, and his body carried to Notre Dame at Rouen and placed near that of his grandfather Pierre. The tomb that his widow Diane erected for Louis in the cathedral of Rouen was one of the early projects of French Renaissance sculptor Jean Goujon.

== Sources ==
- Blunt, Anthony; Beresford, Richard (1990). Art and Architecture in France, 1500-1700. Yale University Press.
- Carroll, Stuart (1998). Noble Power During the French Wars of Religion: The Guise Affinity and the Catholic Cause in Normandy. Cambridge University Press.
- Wellman, Kathleen (2013). Queens and Mistresses of Renaissance France. Yale University Press.
- "Château-du-Bec: Histoire". Château du Bec-Crespin.
- Diane De Poitiers (1499–1566) Encyclopedia
