= Seneschal of Normandy =

The Seneschal of Normandy was an officer carrying out and managing the domestic affairs of the lord of the Duchy of Normandy. During the course of the twelfth century, the seneschalship, also became an office of military command.

The seneschal managed the household, coordinating between the receivers of various landholdings and the chamber, treasury, and the chancellory or chapel. The seneschals of Normandy, like those appointed in Gascony, Poitou, and Anjou had custody of demesne fortresses, the regional treasuries, and presidency of the highest court of regional custom.

== List of Seneschals ==
English

- Osbern the Steward
- William FitzOsbern, 1st Earl of Hereford
- ...
- Robert de Neubourg (1154)
- William de Saint-Jean (1171)
- William de Courcy
- Richard of Ilchester (1176-1178)
- William FitzRalph (1178-1200)
- Guérin de Glapion (1200-1201)
- Ralph Tesson (1201-1203)
- William Crassus (1203)
- ..
- Richard Woodville, 1st Earl Rivers (1423)
- William Hodehal or Hodalle (1424)
- Thomas Scales, 7th Baron Scales (before 1442-1450)

French

- 1451-1460: Pierre de Brézé (1412-1465)
- 1460-1464: Louis d'Estouteville (1400-1464)
- 1475-1494: Jacques de Brézé (1440-1494), son of Pierre;
- 1494-1499: Louis de Brézé, last Seneschal of Normandy, office abolished in 1499.
