= Ann Moss =

British professor of French and French literature

- Born: Jennifer Ann Poole; 21 January 1938
- Died: 13 August 2018 (aged 80)
- Spouse: John Michael Barry Moss (m. 1960; div. 1966)
- Children: Two

Academic background
- Education: Barr's Hill School
- Alma mater: Newnham College, Cambridge
- Thesis: A study of the Latin editions of Ovid and commentaries printed in France, 1487–1600 (1975)

Academic work
- Discipline: French literature classical reception
- Institutions: University College of North Wales; Trevelyan College, Durham; Durham University

Jennifer Ann Moss, FBA (née Poole; 21 January 1938 – 13 August 2018) was a British scholar of French literature and classical reception, specialising in the French Renaissance. She was Professor of French at the University of Durham from 1996 to 2003. In retirement, she became a lay minister in the Church of England.

== Early life and education ==
Moss was born on 21 January 1938 to John Shakespeare Poole and Dorothy Kathleen Beese (née Sills). She was educated at Barr's Hill School, then a grammar school in Coventry, West Midlands. She studied the Medieval and Modern Languages Tripos at Newnham College, Cambridge, graduating with a first class honours Bachelor of Arts (BA) degree in 1959: as per tradition, her BA was promoted to a Master of Arts (MA Cantab) degree. She then began postgraduate studies at Cambridge under the supervision of Ian McFarlane. However, marriage, children and the beginning of her career put her research on pause, before finally completing her Doctor of Philosophy (PhD) degree in 1975. Her doctoral thesis was titled "A study of the Latin editions of Ovid and commentaries printed in France, 1487–1600".

== Academic career ==
From 1963 to 1964, Moss was an assistant lecturer in the French Department of the University College of North Wales in Bangor: she had to give up this job to care for her two young children. After separating from her husband, she joined the newly formed Trevelyan College, Durham as a resident tutor in 1966, living in nearby accommodation with her children and a nanny. She was also a part-time university lecturer while working at Trevelyan from 1966 to 1979. She became a full-time lecturer in French at the University of Durham in 1979, and was promoted to senior lecturer in 1985 and to reader in 1988. She was appointed Professor of French in October 1996, and served as head of the School of Modern European Languages between 2000 and 2003. She was made Professor Emerita on her retirement 2003, and appointed an honorary research fellow of the now named School of Modern Languages to continue her research and lecturing.

Moss's research interests ranged from 16th-century French literature, including Pierre de Ronsard and Michel de Montaigne, to neo-Latin and history of the book. Her second monograph Poetry and Fable: Studies in Mythological Narrative in Sixteenth-Century France (1984) bridged her doctoral studies on Ovid and her more recent interests in French literature. In Printed Commonplace-Books and the Structuring of Renaissance Thought, described by the British Academy as her "landmark monograph", she traced the development of commonplace books from the ancient world into the Middle Ages and then through the age of the printing press. She also had an interest in post-Medieval Latin writings, and regularly spoke at the congresses of the International Association for Neo-Latin Studies.

Outside of her university posts, Moss was active in the administration of the British Academy. She was a member of its Publications Committee from 1999 to 2004 and its council from 2003 to 2006. She served as chair of its Early Modern Languages and Literatures Section from 2007 to 2010.

== Personal life ==
In 1960, she married John Michael Barry Moss (1931–1985), a fellow academic who specialised in the philosophy of science. Together they had two daughters. They divorced in 1966, and she would go on to raise their children as a single parent.

Moss was additionally an active member of the Church of England. She trained as a lay minister in retirement, serving as a reader from 2005 to 2010. She was first assigned to St Oswald's Church, Durham and then to St Paul's Church, Spennymoor.

Moss died on 13 August 2018 in Morden College, Blackheath, London, aged 80. Her funeral mass was held at Durham Cathedral.

== Honours ==
In 1998, Moss was elected a Fellow of the British Academy (FBA), the United Kingdom's national academy for the humanities and social sciences. A Festschrift titled (Re)Inventing the Past was published in her honour on her retirement in 2003. On 28 January 2013, she was awarded the Chancellor's Medal by Durham University in recognition of distinguished service.

== Selected works ==
- Moss, Ann (1982). Ovid in Renaissance France: a survey of the Latin editions of Ovid and commentaries printed in France before 1600. London: Warburg Institute. ISBN 978-0854810598.
- Moss, Ann (1984). Poetry and fable: studies in mythological narrative in sixteenth-century France. Cambridge: Cambridge University Press. ISBN 978-0521258890.
- Moss, Ann (1996). Printed commonplace-books and the structuring of Renaissance thought. Oxford: Clarendon Press. ISBN 978-0198159087.
- Moss, Ann (2003). Renaissance truth and the Latin language turn. Oxford: Oxford University Press. ISBN 978-0199249879.
