= Sayce =

Sayce is a surname, and may refer to:

- Archibald Sayce (1846–1933), British linguist and Assyriologist
- Conrad Sayce (1888–1966), Australian architect and author
- Lynda Sayce, British musician
- Philip Sayce (born 1976), Canadian musician
- Richard Sayce (1917–1977), British academic in French literature
