= François Clouet =

French Renaissance miniaturist and painter (c. 1510–1572)

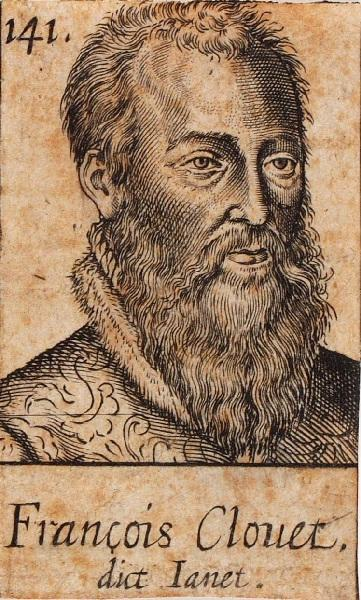
- Born: c. 1510
- Died: 22 December 1572
- Known for: miniaturist; oil painter
- Patrons: Francis I of France; Claude Gouffier

François Clouet (c. 1510 – 22 December 1572), son of Jean Clouet, was a French Renaissance miniaturist and painter, particularly known for his detailed portraits of the French ruling family.

== Historical references ==
François Clouet was born in Tours, as the son of the court painter Jean Clouet. Jean Clouet was a native of the Southern Netherlands and probably from the Brussels area. François Clouet studied under his father. He inherited his father's nickname 'Janet' and is referred to as such in some early sources and the older literature.

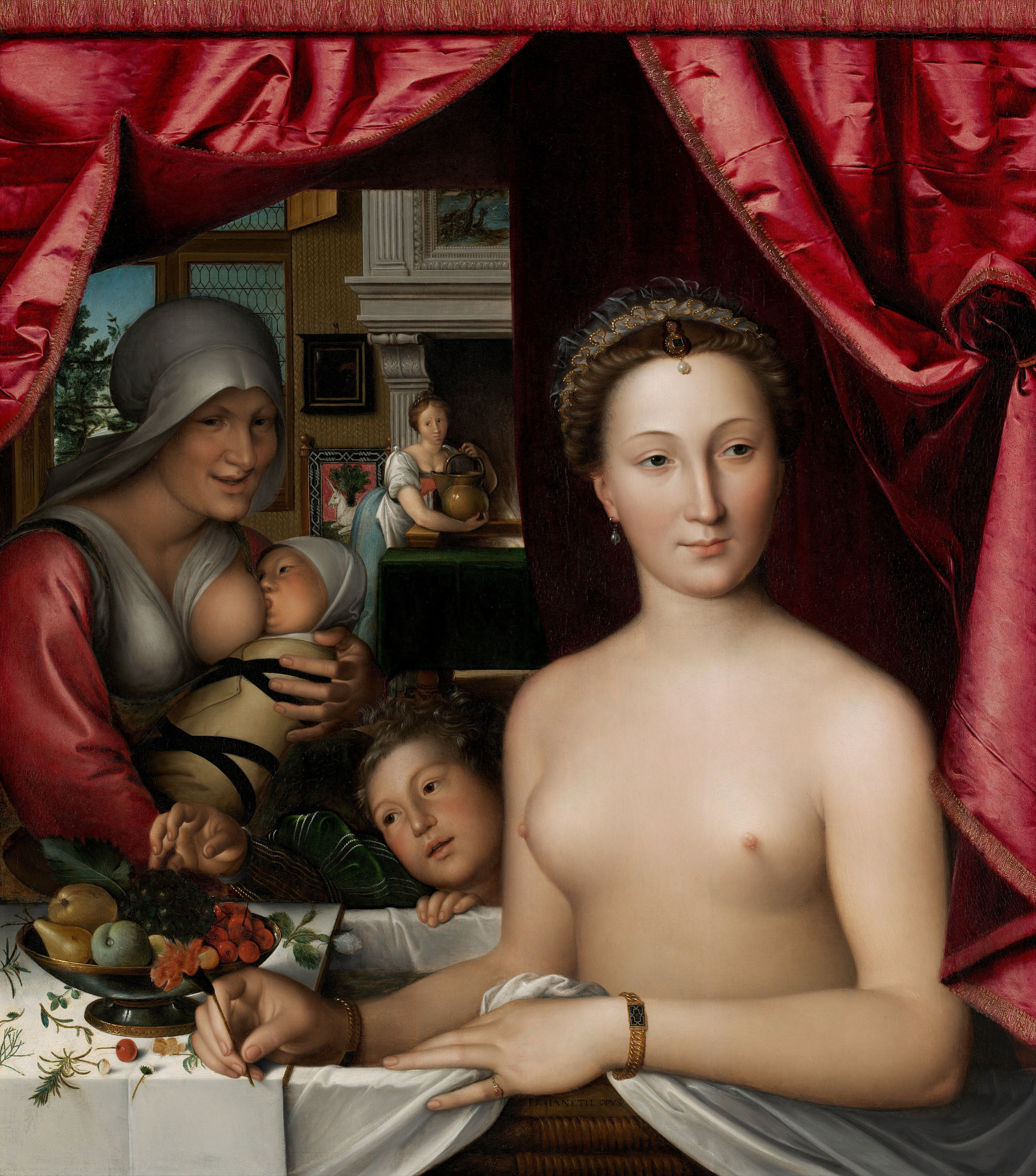
A Lady in Her Bath, probably depicting Diane de Poitiers or Mary, Queen of Scots, National Gallery of Art, Washington, D.C., 1571

The earliest reference to François Clouet is a document dated December 1541 in which the king renounces for the benefit of François his father's estate, which had escheated to the crown as the estate of a foreigner. In this document, the younger Clouet is said to have followed his father very closely in his art. Like his father, he held the office of groom of the chamber and painter in ordinary to the king, and so far as salary is concerned, he started where his father left off. Many drawings are attributed to this artist, often without perfect certainty. There is, however, more to go upon than there is in the case of his father.

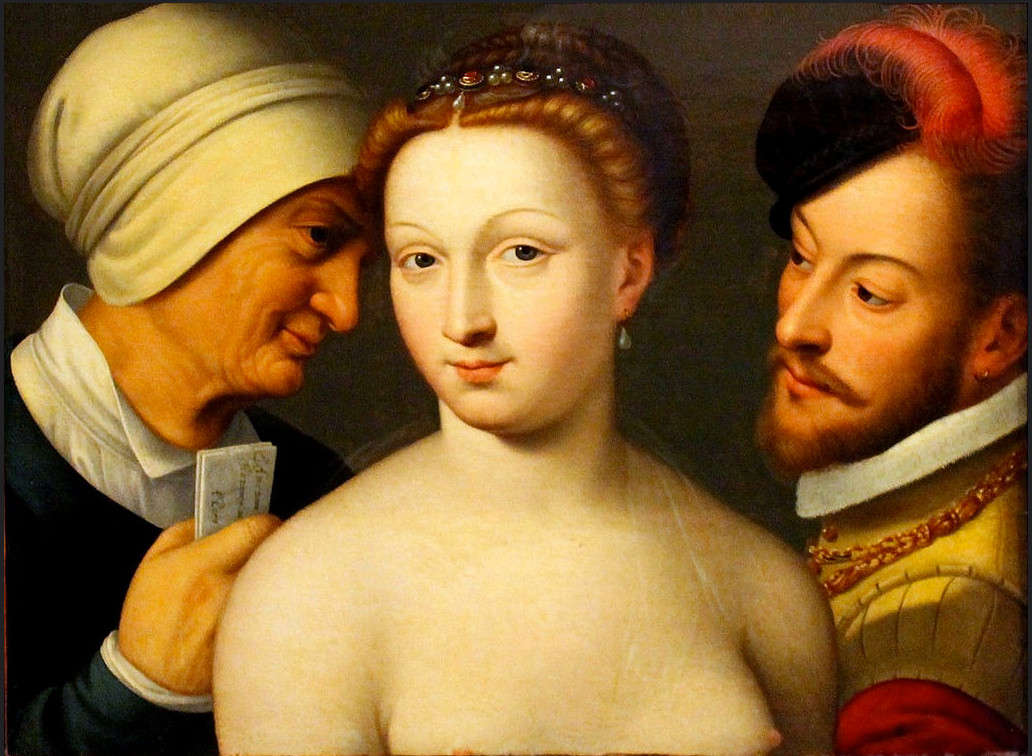
Le Billet Doux, Museo Thyssen-Bornemisza, 1570s

As the praises of François Clouet were sung by the writers of the day, his name was carefully preserved from reign to reign, and there is an ancient and unbroken tradition in the attribution of many of his pictures. There are not, however, any original attestations of his works, nor are any documents known which would guarantee the ascriptions usually accepted. To him are attributed the portraits of Francis I at the Uffizi and at the Louvre, and various drawings relating to them.

He probably also painted the portrait of Catherine de' Medici at Versailles and other works, and in all probability a large number of the drawings ascribed to him were from his hand.

Charles IX of France

One of his most remarkable portraits is that of Mary, Queen of Scots, a drawing in chalks in the Bibliothèque Nationale, and of similar character are the two portraits of Charles IX and the one at Chantilly of Marguerite of France. Perhaps his masterpiece is the portrait of Elizabeth of Austria in the Louvre. This piece made an important impression on Claude Lévi-Strauss. In particular it helped inspire his theory of the modèle réduit, or of works of art as 'miniature models', and other theories of artworks, in his book The Savage Mind.

Clouet resided in Paris in the rue de Ste Avoye in the Temple quarter, close to the Hotel de Guise, and in 1568 is known to have been under the patronage of Claude Gouffier de Boisy, Seigneur d'Oiron, and his wife Claude de Baune. Another ascertained fact concerning François Clouet is that in 1571 he was summoned to the office of the Court of the Mint, and his opinion was taken on the likeness to the king of a portrait struck by the mint. He prepared the death-mask of Henry II, as in 1547 he had taken a similar mask of the face and hands of Francis I, in order that the effigy to be used at the funeral might be prepared from his drawings; and on each of these occasions he executed the painting to be used in the decorations of the church and the banners for the great ceremony.

Several miniatures are believed to be his work, one very remarkable portrait being the half-length figure of Henry II in the collection of J. Pierpont Morgan. Another of his portraits is that of François, duc d'Alençon in the Jones collection at the Victoria & Albert Museum. Catherine de Medici described the efforts of Maistre Jamet (he used his father's name) on Alençon's portrait to the ambassador in London, Mothe Fénelon. Certain representations of members of the royal family which were in the Hamilton Palace collection and the Magniac sale are usually ascribed to him.

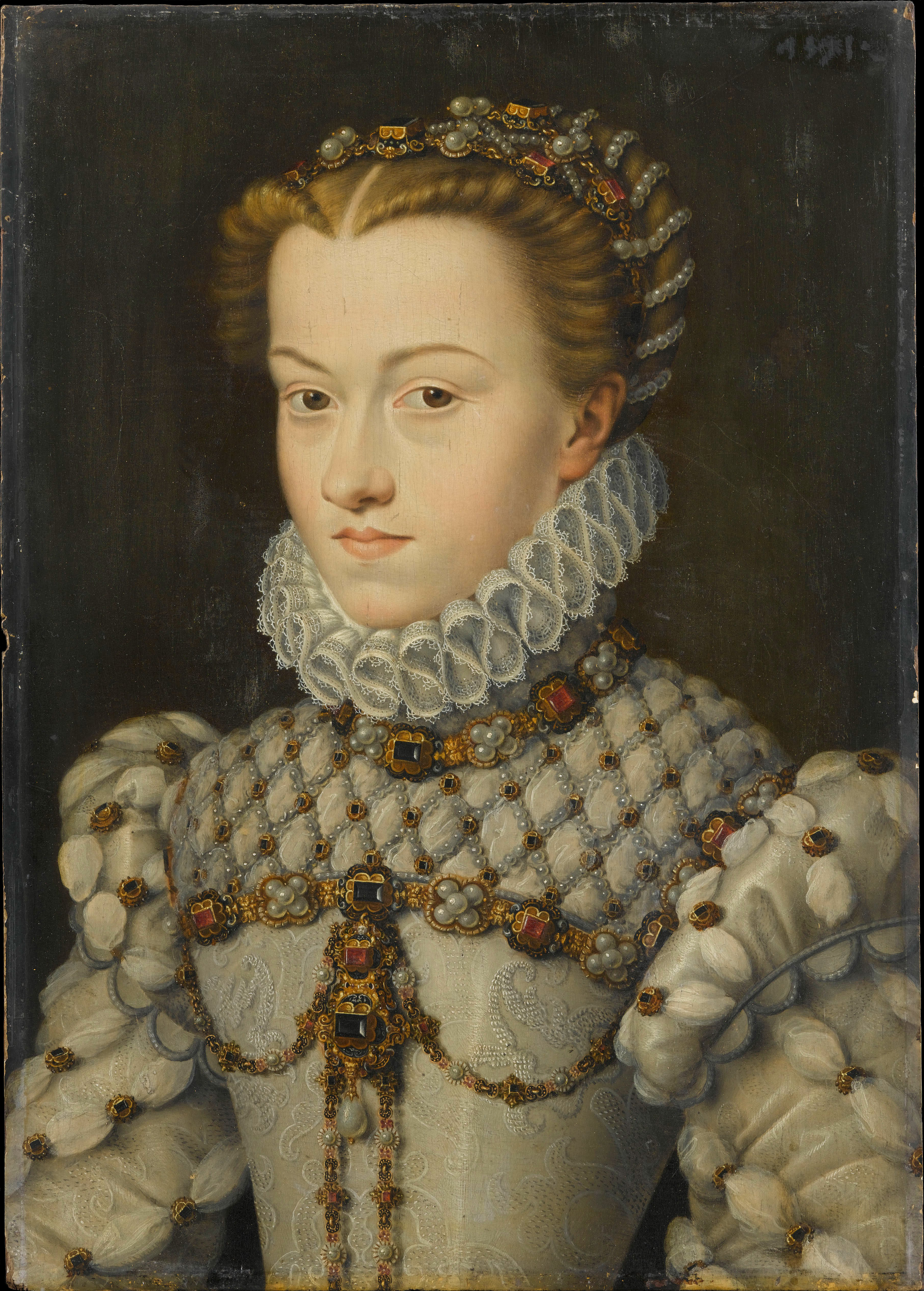
Elisabeth of Austria, c. 1571

He died on 22 December 1572, shortly after the massacre of St Bartholomew, and his will, mentioning his sister and his two illegitimate daughters, and dealing with the disposition of a considerable amount of property, is still in existence. His daughters subsequently became nuns.
