= Ian McFarlane (literary scholar) =

British scholar (1915–2002)

Ian Dalrymple McFarlane MBE, FBA
- Born: November 7, 1915; Newcastle upon Tyne, England
- Died: August 17, 2002 (aged 86)
- Children: 1

Academic background
- Education: Lycée Saint-Charles; Westminster School
- Alma mater: University of St Andrews; University of Paris

Academic work
- Discipline: Modern languages
- Sub-discipline: French literature, Neo-Latin poetry
- Institutions: University of Cambridge; Gonville and Caius College, Cambridge; University of St AndrewsUniversity of Oxford; Wadham College, Oxford

Ian Dalrymple McFarlane, MBE, FBA (7 November 1915 – 17 August 2002) was a British scholar of French literature. He was the Buchanan Professor of French at the University of St Andrews (1961–71) and the Professor of French Literature at the University of Oxford (1971–83).

== Early life and education ==
The son of a Scottish naval engineer and shipyard manager, McFarlane was born in Newcastle upon Tyne on 7 November 1915. He was largely brought up in France; he attended the Lycée Saint-Charles in Marseille (having also spent time in an English preparatory school in Kent) and, from 1929, Westminster School, where he was a King's Scholar and showed an aptitude for languages. In 1934, he went to study modern languages at the University of St Andrews, spending his summers in Germany. He graduated in 1938 and then went to Paris to continue his studies, but returned to England on the outbreak of the Second World War in 1939.

== Career, research and honours ==
McFarlane served as an officer in the British Army from 1940 and was captured by the Germans during their invasion of France while he was waiting to be evacuated at Dunkirk. He remained a prisoner of war until 1945. That year, after demobilisation (he ended the war a captain and was appointed an MBE for his service), he was appointed a university lecturer in French at the University of Cambridge. In 1947, he was also elected to the first fellowship in French at Gonville and Caius College, Cambridge; his modern languages colleagues were Francis Bennett and Eric Blackall. Meanwhile, he resumed his doctoral studies and was awarded a PhD by the University of Paris in 1950. In 1961, he returned to the University of St Andrews to be the Buchanan Professor of French. He remained there until 1971, when he was appointed the Professor of French Literature at the University of Oxford (which was attached to a fellowship at Wadham College, Oxford); he retired in 1983.

McFarlane's monograph studies included Renaissance France, 1470–1589 for the Literary History of France series (1974) and a biography of George Buchanan entitled simply Buchanan (1981). He also produced an edition of Maurice Scève's Délie (1966), and of Pierre Corneille's plays Cinna ou la clémence d'Auguste (1965) and Horace (1971); he edited The Entry of Henry II into Paris 16 June 1549 (1982) and an anthology Renaissance Latin Poetry (1980), as well as the collection Renaissance Studies: Six Essays (with A. H. Ashe and D. D. R. Owen, 1972), a Festschrift for Harry Barnwell and a collection of essays brought together in memory of Richard Sayce (the latter two in 1982). He was elected a fellow of the British Academy in 1978. He was the president of the International Association of Neo-Latin Studies from 1979 to 1982 and the Zaharoff Lecturer at the University of Oxford in 1984. In 1984, he was presented with a Festschrift, Neo-Latin and the Vernacular in Renaissance France, edited by Grahame Castor and Terence Cave. McFarlane died on 17 August 2002. He was survived by his son; his wife, Marjory, had died the previous year.
