= Jane A. Langdale =

British geneticist and academic

Jane Langdale CBE FRS
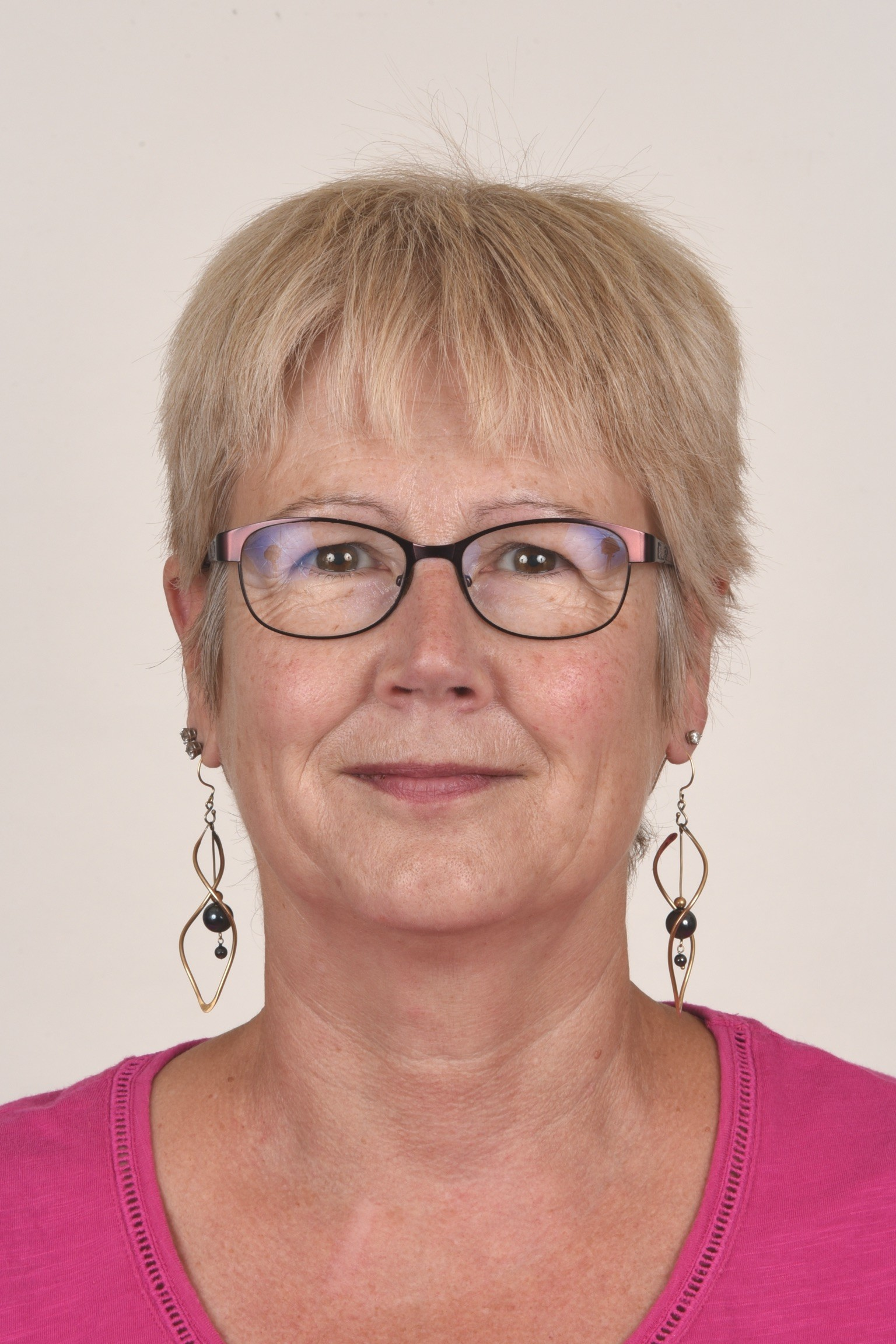
- Born: Jane Alison Langdale; 25 August 1960 (age 66); Coventry
- Education: Barr's Hill School
- Alma mater: University of Bath (BSc); University of London (PhD)
- Awards: EMBO Membership (2007); Doctor of Science (2018); Foreign Associate of the National Academy of Sciences (2019)
- Scientific career
- Fields: Plant science; C4 carbon fixation
- Workplaces: Yale University; University of Oxford
- Thesis: Gene detection using immobilised DNA probes (1985)
- Website: langdalelab.com

Jane Alison Langdale, CBE FRS (born 1960) is a British geneticist and academic. She is Professor of Plant Development in the Department of Biology at the University of Oxford and a Professorial Fellow at The Queen's College, Oxford.

== Education ==
Langdale was educated at Barr's Hill Grammar School in Coventry and the University of Bath, where she was awarded a Bachelor of Science degree in Applied Biology in 1982, specialising in microbiology. Her PhD was in human genetics and carried out at St Mary's Hospital Medical School and Charing Cross and Westminster Medical School and awarded by the University of London.

== Career and research ==
Following her PhD, Langdale was employed for five years as a postdoctoral researcher at Yale University with Tim Nelson. She returned to the UK in 1990, to work in the Department of Plant Sciences (since 2022 the Department of Biology) where she has worked since. Langdale's research interests are in two main areas:

1. the evolution of leaf development and meristem function in bryophytes, lycophytes and monilophytes
2. the evolution and development of kranz anatomy in C4 plants,

Langdale's research has been funded by the Biotechnology and Biological Sciences Research Council (BBSRC) and has been published in leading peer reviewed scientific journals.

Langdale is the co-author of the book How to Succeed as a Scientist: From Postdoc to Professor with materials scientist Barbara Gabrys. She featured on the BBC series, Plants: From Roots to Riches in 2014 with Kathy Willis.

=== Awards and honours ===
Langdale was elected a Fellow of the Royal Society (FRS) in 2015. Her certificate of election reads:

Jane Langdale has produced a body of work that has transformed our understanding of how plants make leaves and how leaves changed during major evolutionary transitions. The breadth of her research program has led to the elucidation of mechanisms operating throughout leaf development – from the earliest stages of organ inception and specification at the shoot apex, through patterning of distinct cell-types, to chloroplast biogenesis. She has done all of this in a comparative framework and has thus advanced our understanding of leaf development not just in model flowering plant species but in species from all major land plant lineages.

Langdale was elected a member of the European Molecular Biology Organization (EMBO) in 2007 and appointed Commander of the Most Excellent Order of the British Empire (CBE) in the 2018 Birthday Honours for services to Plant Science. She was awarded a Doctor of Science degree (DSc) honoris causa by the University of Bath in 2018.

She was elected a foreign associate of the National Academy of Sciences of the United States in April 2019.

She was elected a corresponding member of the Australian Academy of Science in 2020.

She was called as an Honorary Bencher at Middle Temple In 2025.

== Personal life ==
Langdale has always had Airedale Terriers and is the elder sibling of the barrister Rachel Langdale King's Counsel (KC).
