= Jennie Page =

British businesswoman

Jennie Page CBE

Jennifer Anne Page, CBE (born 12 November 1944) worked as a senior executive in the British public sector, serving as Chief Executive and Commissioner of English Heritage (1989-1995), Chief Executive of the Millennium Commission (1995-1997) and Chief Executive of the New Millennium Experience Company which built the London Millennium Dome (1997-2000).

Page also held non-executive director roles at organisations including British Railways Board, Railtrack plc and The Equitable Life Assurance Company.

From 2001 to the present day, Page’s focus has been the care and preservation of heritage buildings, principally English churches and cathedrals.

== Education ==
Page attended Barr's Hill Grammar School for Girls. She was later educated at Royal Holloway, University of London where, as an undergraduate she had been awarded the George Smith Studentship and where she obtained a First-Class Honours BA degree in English in 1966 followed by a Driver postgraduate scholarship.

== Early career ==
Page worked as a civil servant in the Departments of the Environment and Transport, and on secondment to the British National Oil Corporation and subsequently to London Docklands Development Corporation. Page was Vice-President, then Senior Vice-President in Pallas Group (1984-1989).

Page was Chief Executive of English Heritage from 1989 to 1995, having been recruited by then chairman, Lord Montagu of Beaulieu. She later worked for chairman Jocelyn Stevens, who praised her work for English Heritage when she left.

Page was non-executive director of the British Railways Board (1993-1994) and of Railtrack Group plc (1994-2001).

She was also a non-executive director of The Equitable Life Assurance Society which almost collapsed financially in the millennium year. The Society issued claims for negligence against nine former directors, including Page, but in 2005 conceded total defeat in a four-year £3.2bn legal action to obtain compensation for policyholders. £10.2m was paid to the former directors to cover much of their legal expenses with Page paid just over £3m.

== The Millennium ==
Page was headhunted for the role of Chief Executive of the Millennium Commission by the then Heritage Secretary, Stephen Dorrell, according to The Observer.

While at the Millennium Commission, Page was responsible for the overseeing the awarding of major grants including Tate Modern, The Earth Centre, the British Museum Great Court, Wales Millennium Centre and Glasgow Science Centre.

Page also oversaw the Millennium Commission’s initiative to create a national exhibition on the line of The Festival Of Britain (1951) and their selection of a disused gas site on the Greenwich Peninsula. The site led to the creation of the Millennium Dome, “at that time the largest structure of its kind in the world.”

In 1997, Page became Chief Executive of the government-owned New Millennium Experience Company, created to build and operate the Millennium Dome as well as create the National Programme, “a new range of partnerships between private, public and voluntary sectors.” These represented 20% of the Millennium Commission’s allocation of National Lottery Money.

In January 1998, Stephen Bayley, creative director of the project, resigned after six months in post. He described Government Minister Peter Mandelson, whose project it had become, as a dictator reminiscent of: "an East German Stalinist".

“The Dome opened on time and within cost, a huge achievement for its boss, Jennie Page.” “Enticing 6 million visitors to Greenwich was no mean achievement. After a shaky start, the Dome became by far the most popular paying attraction in Britain, three times its nearest rival, Alton Towers.”

"The Dome's vision of radiant coherence which was to be presented to the public in January 2000 was not easily arrived at. It was, in its making, a theatre of conflicting interests... Nothing on this scale of sponsorship; nothing on this scale of state cultural ambition, nothing on this scale of visitor numbers; nothing as expensive had ever been attempted in Britain."

Page resigned as Chief Executive on 5 February 2000. She had come under pressure after problems at the opening night on 31 December 1999, followed by poor attendance in January 2000. She was replaced by Pierre-Yves Gerbeau, a 34-year-old Frenchman known as "P-Y" and also nicknamed "the Gerbil" by the popular press, who had previously worked for the Disneyland Paris theme park.

During her time at the Dome, and with compensation for her early departure, Page was rumored to have received a salary of £500,000. Later, in June 2000, Page gave evidence to the House of Commons Select Committee for Culture, Media and Sport. She stated that "[t]he Dome had been seen by ministers and the public as a political project almost since its inception". In what was seen as a reference to the close interest in the Dome from Peter Mandelson, the former so-called "Minister for the Dome", and his successor Lord Falconer of Thoroton, Page told the committee: "I made several attempts to persuade ministers that standing back from the Dome would be good for them as well as good for the Dome".

Page talked about the experience of leading the Dome project ten years later in August 2010 on BBC Radio 4's The Reunion with Lord Falconer of Thoroton, Mike Davies, Eva Jiricna and Peter Higgins.

The structure was later turned into the O2, a key part of the regeneration of the Greenwich peninsula.

== Post-Millennium career ==
Since the Millennium, Page’s focus has been the care and preservation of heritage buildings, principally English churches and cathedrals.

From 2001-2004, Page was advisor to the Phoenix Trust, founded by the then Prince of Wales, now King Charles III, to save large unusual neglected historic buildings.

Page was appointed vice-chair the Cathedrals Fabric Commission for England (2006-2016). Page was also vice-chair (2016-2019) then chair (2019-2024) of the Church Buildings Council. During this period, she served on the Church of England Church Buildings Review (2015) and the Church of England Cathedrals Working Group (2017). Page was also a trustee of the National Churches Trust (2008-2019) and has, since 2016, been chair of the Fabric Advisory Committees of Coventry Cathedral and Worcester Cathedral. She was also Chair of Launde Abbey Trust until 2026, having become a member of the Board in 2019.

== Personal life and honours ==
Page married Jeremy David Orme (1943-2023) in 2001. An accountant, Orme was a key player in the development of financial regulation and specialised in the analysis and pursuit of financial crime.

Page graduated in 2010 with a BA in Theology from King’s College London.

Page is an Hon FRIBA and was awarded CBE in 1994.
