= French Renaissance =

French cultural and artistic movement

The French Renaissance was the cultural and artistic movement in France between the 15th and early 17th centuries. The period is associated with the pan-European Renaissance, a word first used by the French historian Jules Michelet to define the artistic and cultural "rebirth" of Europe.

Notable developments during the French Renaissance include the spread of humanism, early exploration of the "New World" (as New France by Giovanni da Verrazzano and Jacques Cartier); the development of new techniques and artistic forms in the fields of printing, architecture, painting, sculpture, music, the sciences and literature; and the elaboration of new codes of sociability, etiquette and discourse.

The French Renaissance traditionally extends from (roughly) the 1494 French invasion of Italy during the reign of Charles VIII until the 1610 death of Henry IV, with an apex during the 1515–1559 reigns of Francis I and Henry II.

This chronology notwithstanding, certain artistic, technological or literary developments associated with the Renaissance arrived in France earlier (for example, by way of the Burgundy court or the papal court in Avignon); however, the Black Death of the 14th century and the Hundred Years' War kept France economically and politically weak until the late 15th century.

== The word renaissance ==
The word renaissance is a French word, whose literal translation into English is "rebirth". The term was first used and defined by French historian Jules Michelet in his 1855 work Histoire de France (History of France). Jules Michelet defined the 16th-century Renaissance in France as a period in Europe's cultural history that represented a break from the Middle Ages, creating a modern understanding of humanity and its place in the world. As a French citizen and historian, Michelet also claimed the Renaissance as a French movement.

== Art ==
In the late 15th century, the French invasion of Italy and the proximity of the vibrant Burgundy court (with its Flemish connections) brought the French into contact with the goods, paintings, and the creative spirit of the Northern and Italian Renaissance, and the initial artistic changes in France were often carried out by Italian and Flemish artists, such as Jean Clouet and his son François Clouet and the Italians Rosso Fiorentino, Francesco Primaticcio and Niccolò dell'Abbate of the first School of Fontainebleau (from 1531).

In 1516, Francis I of France invited Leonardo da Vinci to the Château d'Amboise and provided him with the Château du Clos Lucé, then called Château de Cloux, as a place to stay and work. Leonardo, a famous painter and inventor, arrived with three of his paintings, namely the Mona Lisa, Sainte Anne, and Saint Jean Baptiste, today owned by the Louvre museum of Paris.

The art of the period from Francis I through Henry IV is often inspired by late Italian pictorial and sculptural developments commonly referred to as Mannerism (associated with Michelangelo and Parmigianino, among others), characterized by figures which are elongated and graceful and a reliance on visual rhetoric, including the elaborate use of allegory and mythology.

There are a number of French artists in this period including the painter Jean Fouquet of Tours (who achieved realistic portraits and remarkable illuminated manuscripts) and the sculptors Jean Goujon and Germain Pilon.

Late Mannerism and early Baroque

Henry IV invited the artists Toussaint Dubreuil, Martin Fréminet and Ambroise Dubois to work on the château of Fontainebleau and they are typically called the second School of Fontainebleau.

Marie de' Medici, Henry IV's queen, invited the Flemish painter Peter Paul Rubens to France, and the artist painted a number of large-scale works for the queen's Luxembourg Palace in Paris. Another Flemish artist working for the court was Frans Pourbus the younger.

Outside France, working for the dukes of Lorraine, one finds a very different late mannerist style in the artists Jacques Bellange, Claude Deruet and Jacques Callot. Having little contact with the French artists of the period, they developed a heightened, extreme, and often erotic mannerism (including night scenes and nightmare images), and excellent skill in etching.

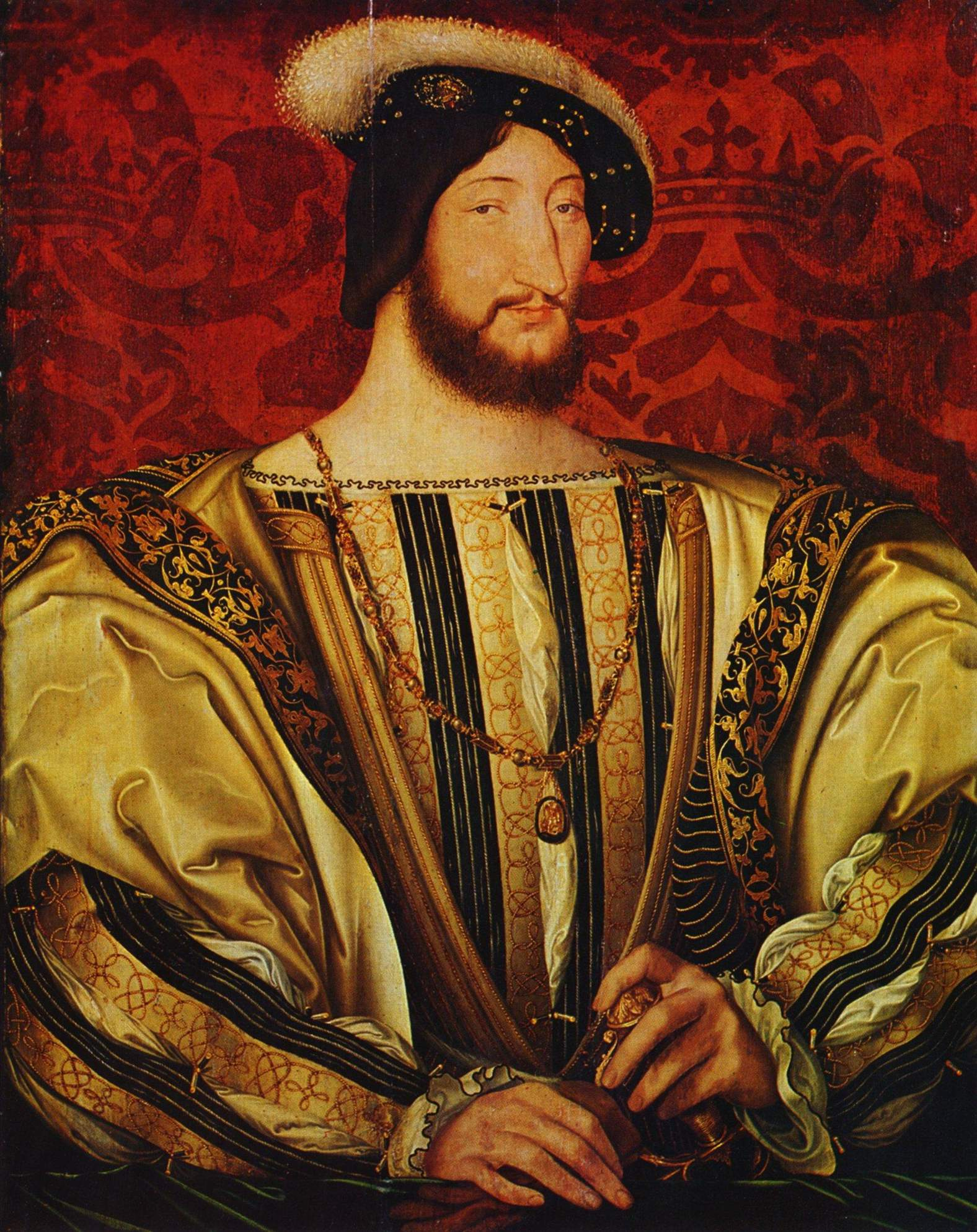
Francis I of France, by Jean and François Clouet (c. 1535, oil on panel) (Louvre).

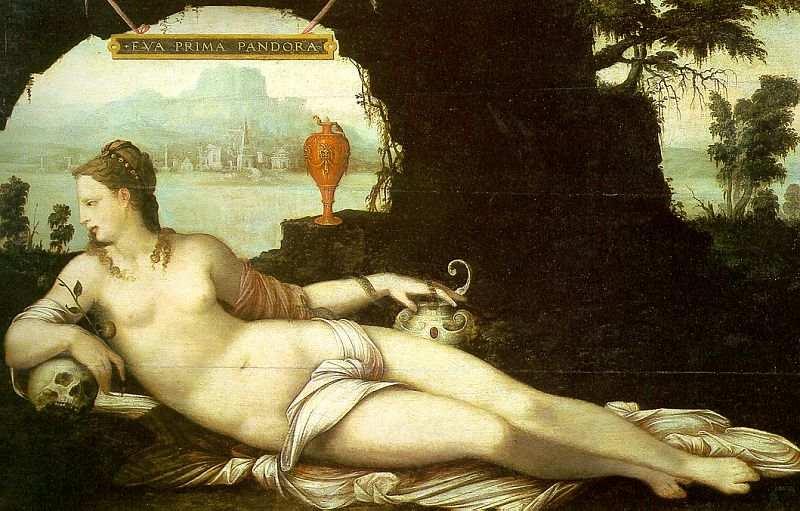
Eve, First Pandora by Jean Cousin the Elder (c. 1550).

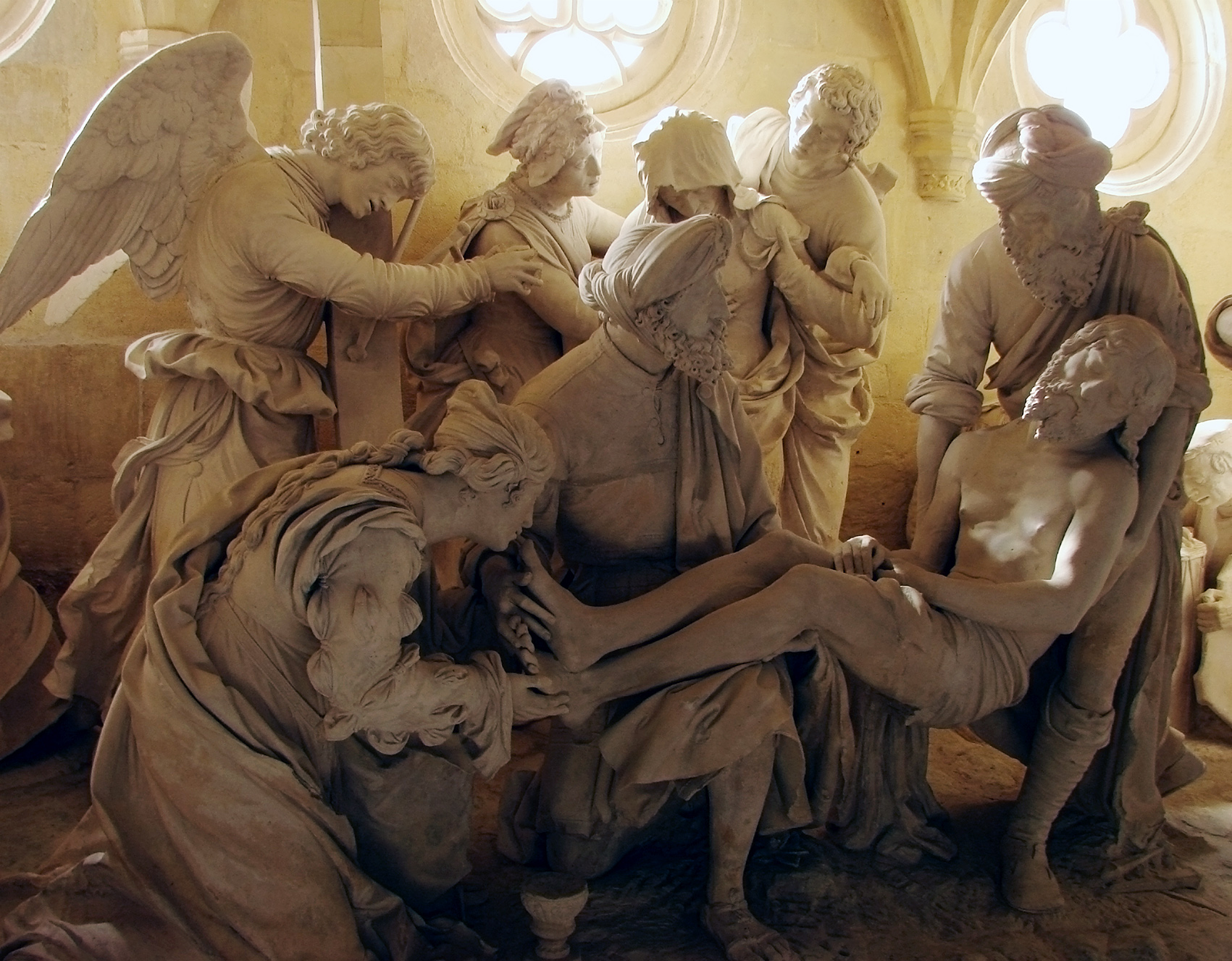
Ligier Richier, Lamentation of Christ, Church of St. Étienne, Saint-Mihiel

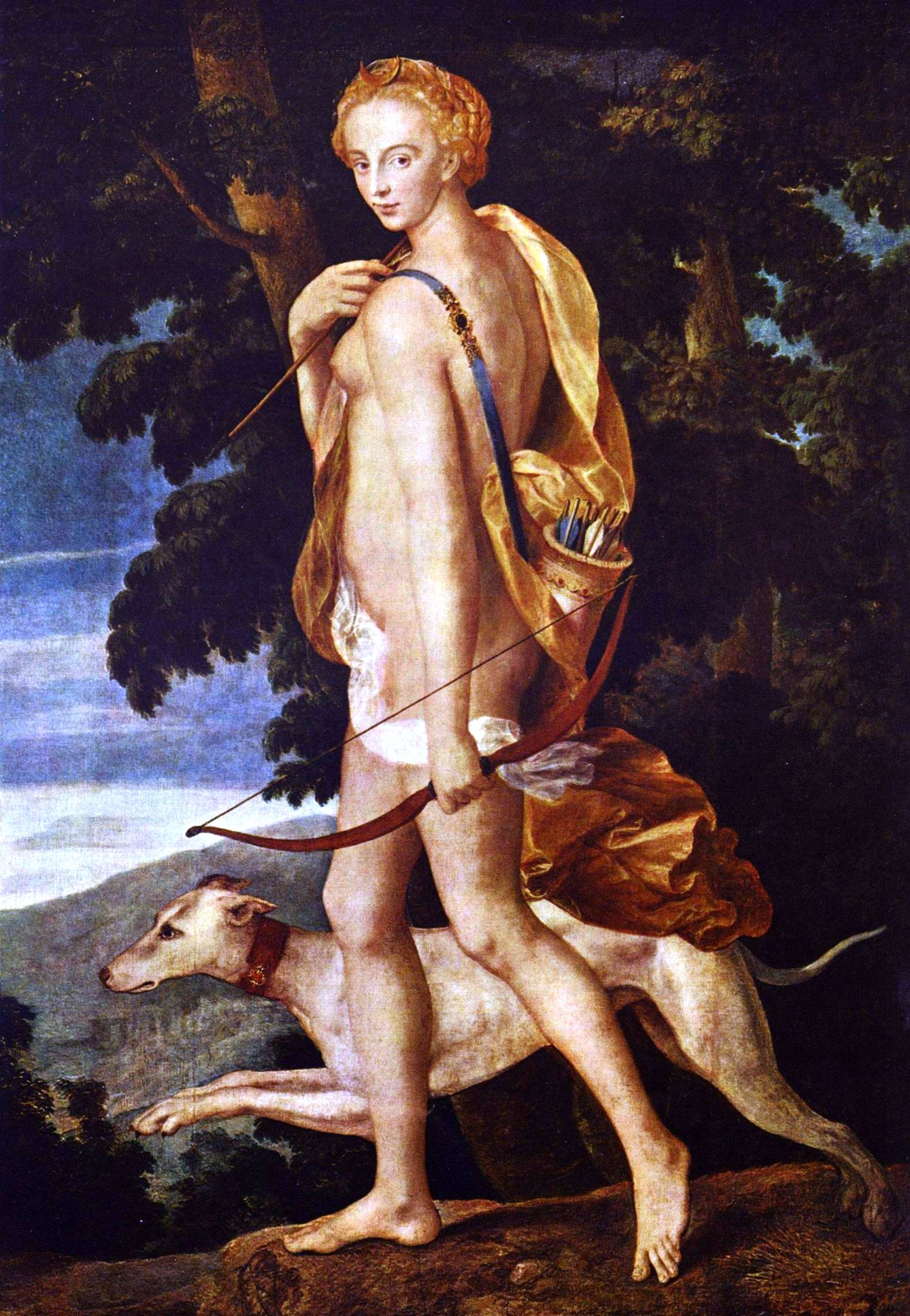
Diane the Huntress, School of Fontainebleau (1550–60) (Louvre).

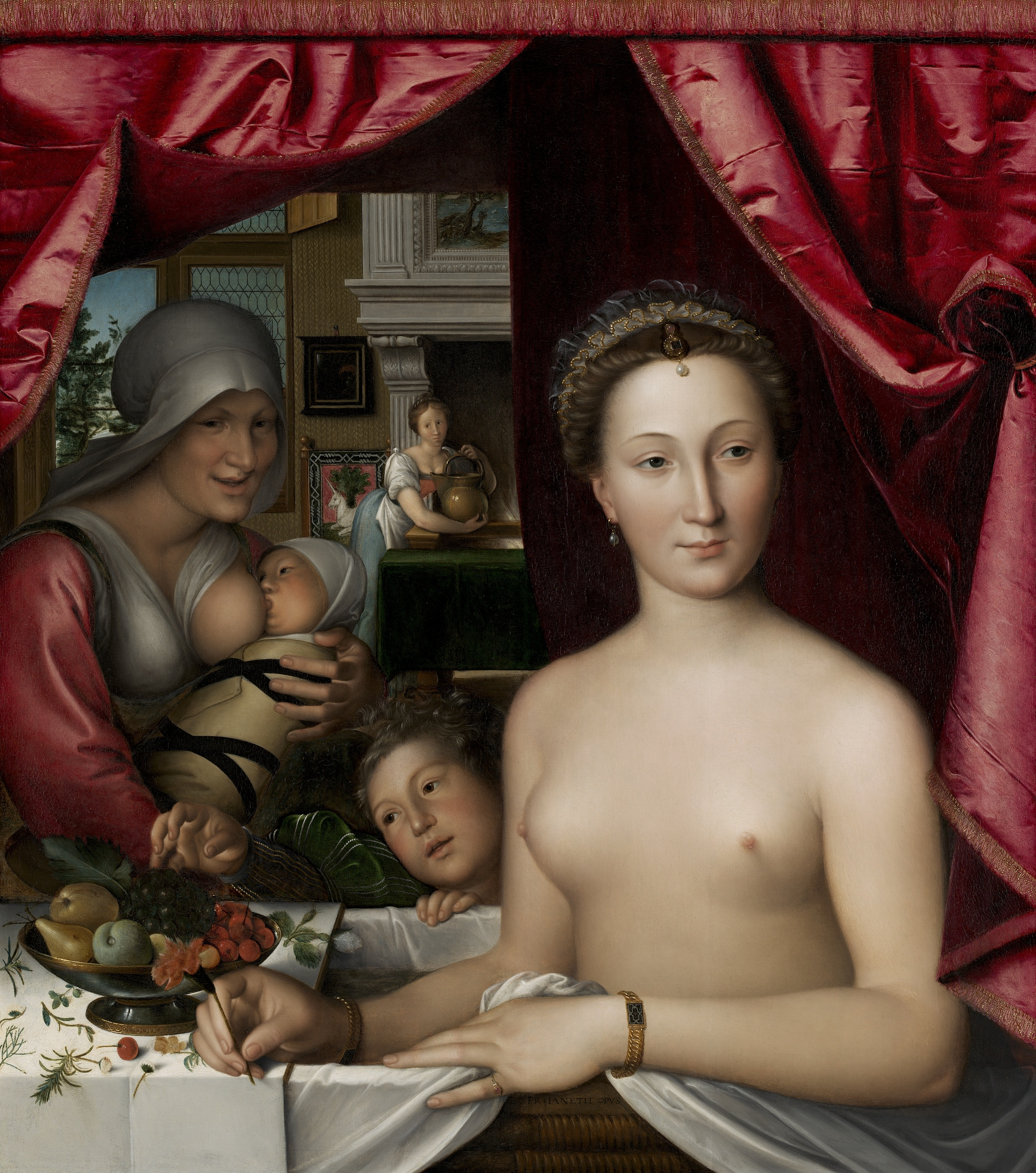
Lady in her Bath by François Clouet (c. 1570) (National Gallery, Washington).

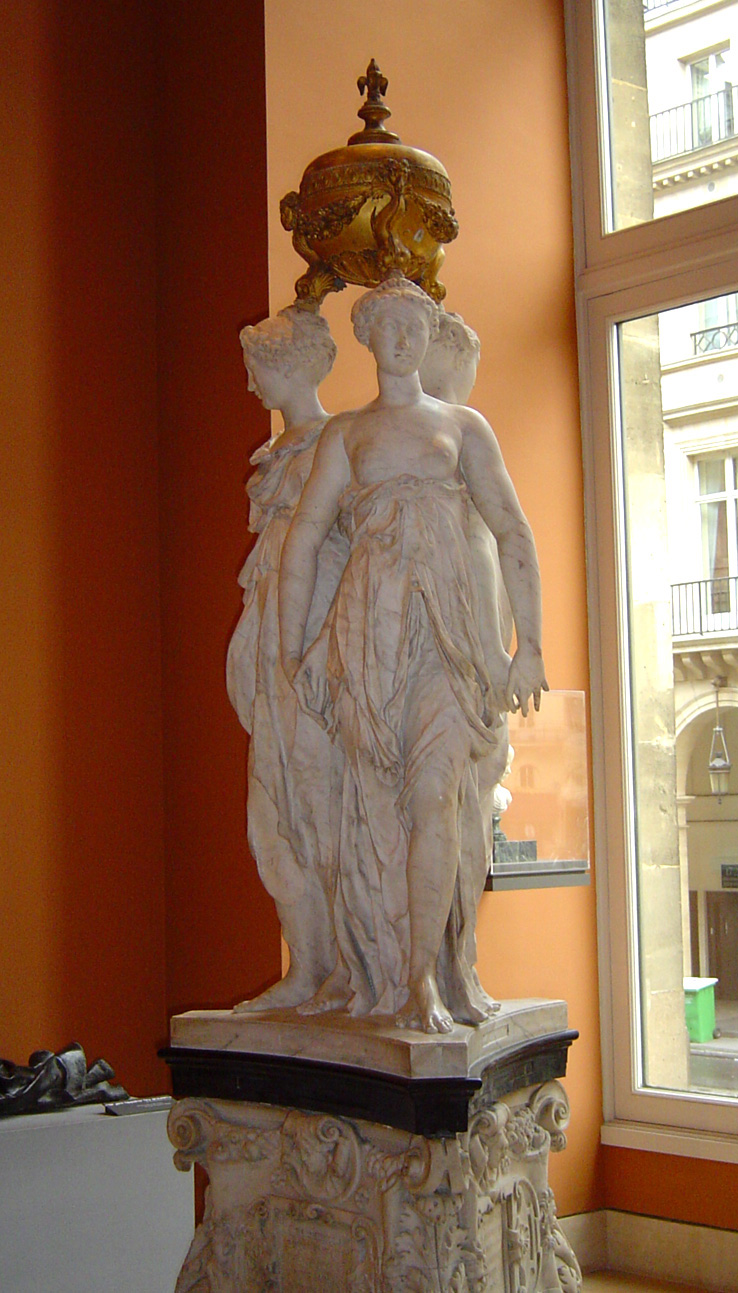
Monument containing the heart of Henry II of France by Germain Pilon.

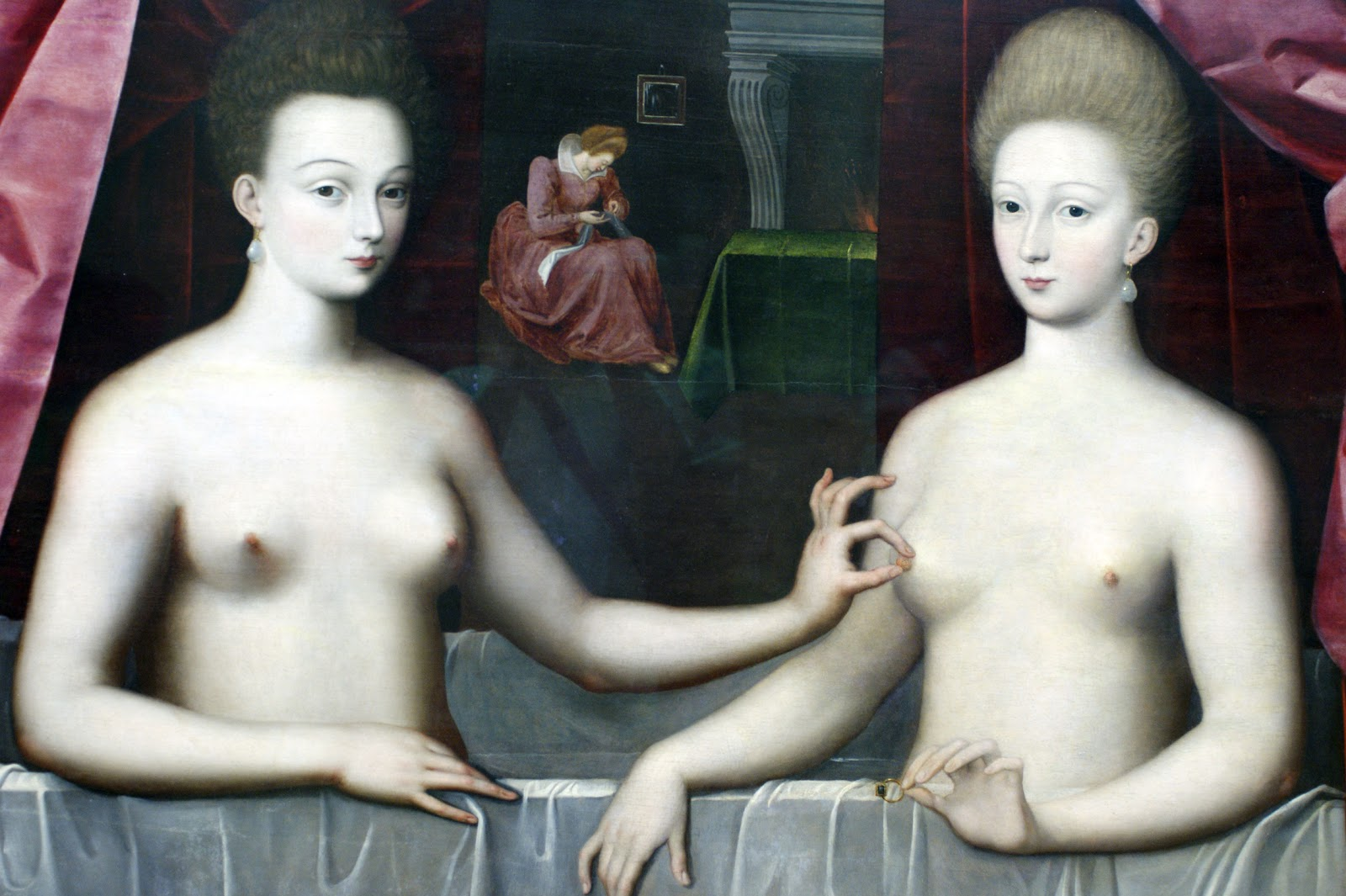
Portrait of Gabrielle d'Estrées and Duchess of Villars, School of Fontainebleau, c. 1594

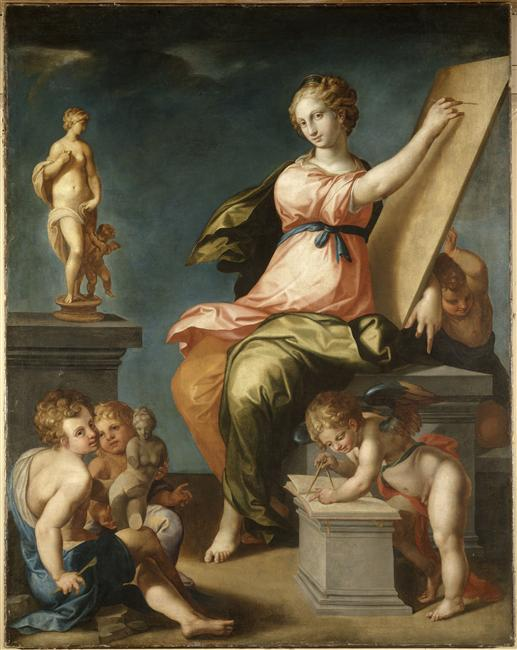
Allégorie de la Peinture et de la Sculpture, Ambroise Dubois

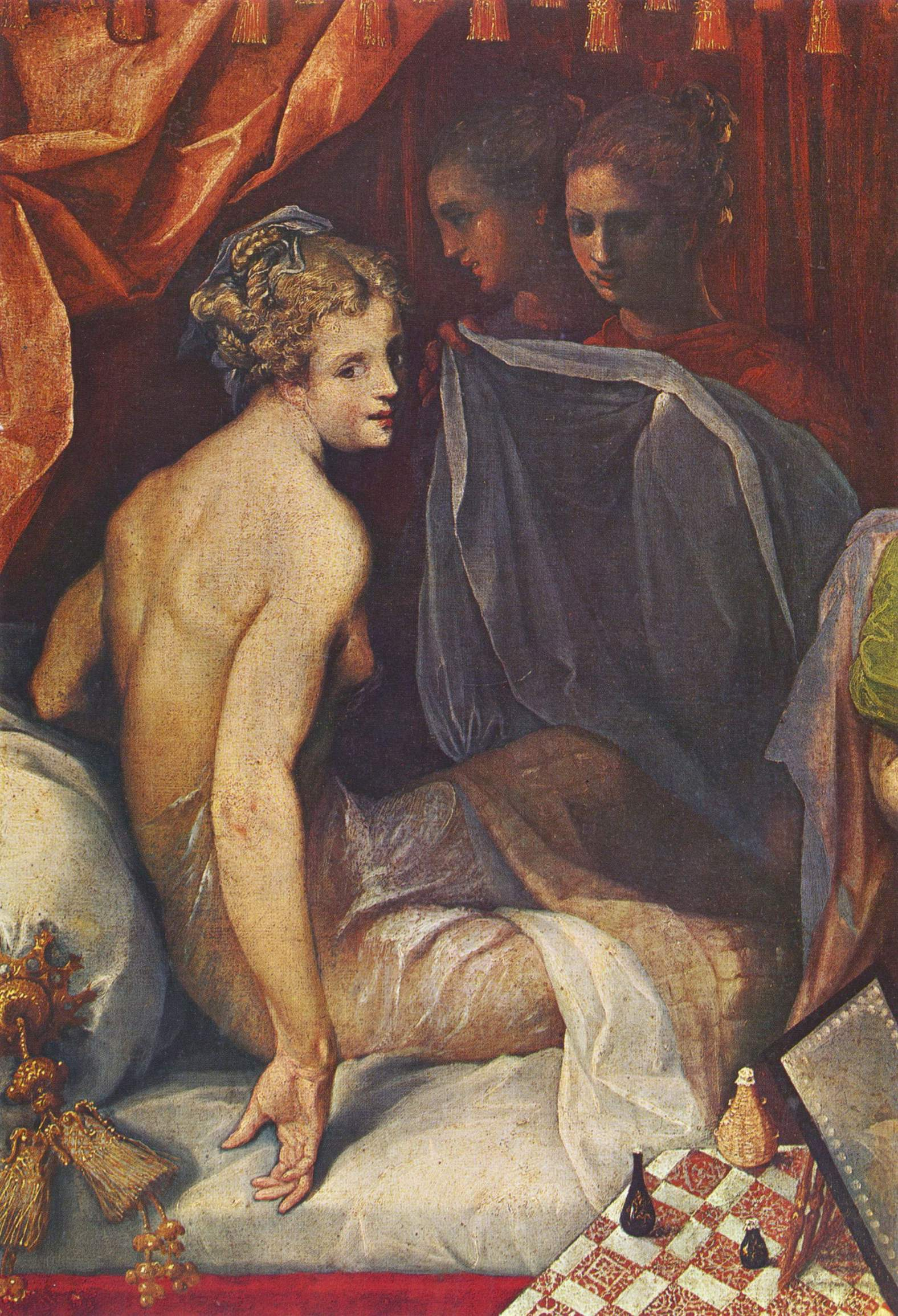
Hyacinthe and Climène at Their Morning Toilet (detail) by Toussaint Dubreuil, a scene from Pierre de Ronsard's Franciade (c. 1602) (Louvre)

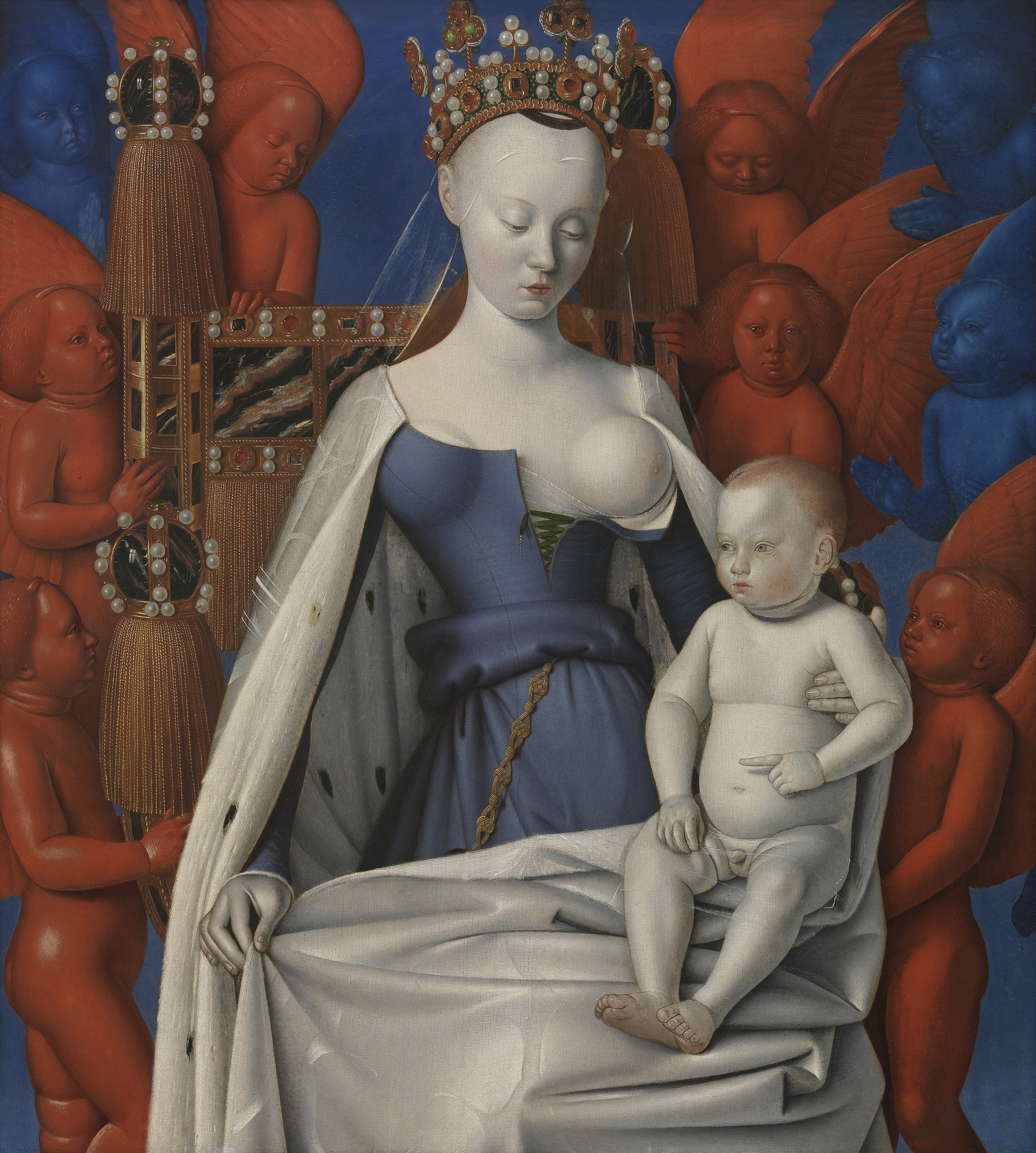
Virgin and Child Surrounded by Angels, Melun Diptych by Jean Fouquet, c. 1450

== Architecture ==
One of the great accomplishments of the French Renaissance was the construction of the Châteaux of the Loire Valley: no longer conceived of as fortresses, these palaces took advantage of the richness of the rivers and lands of the Loire region and they show remarkable architectural skill.

The old Louvre castle in Paris was also rebuilt under the direction of Pierre Lescot and would become the core of a brand new Renaissance château. To the west of the Louvre, Catherine de' Medici had built for her the Tuileries palace with extensive gardens and a grotte.

The ascension of Henry IV of France to the throne brought a period of massive urban development in Paris, including construction on the Pont Neuf, the Place des Vosges (called the "Place Royale"), the Place Dauphine, and parts of the Louvre (amongst which the Great Gallery).

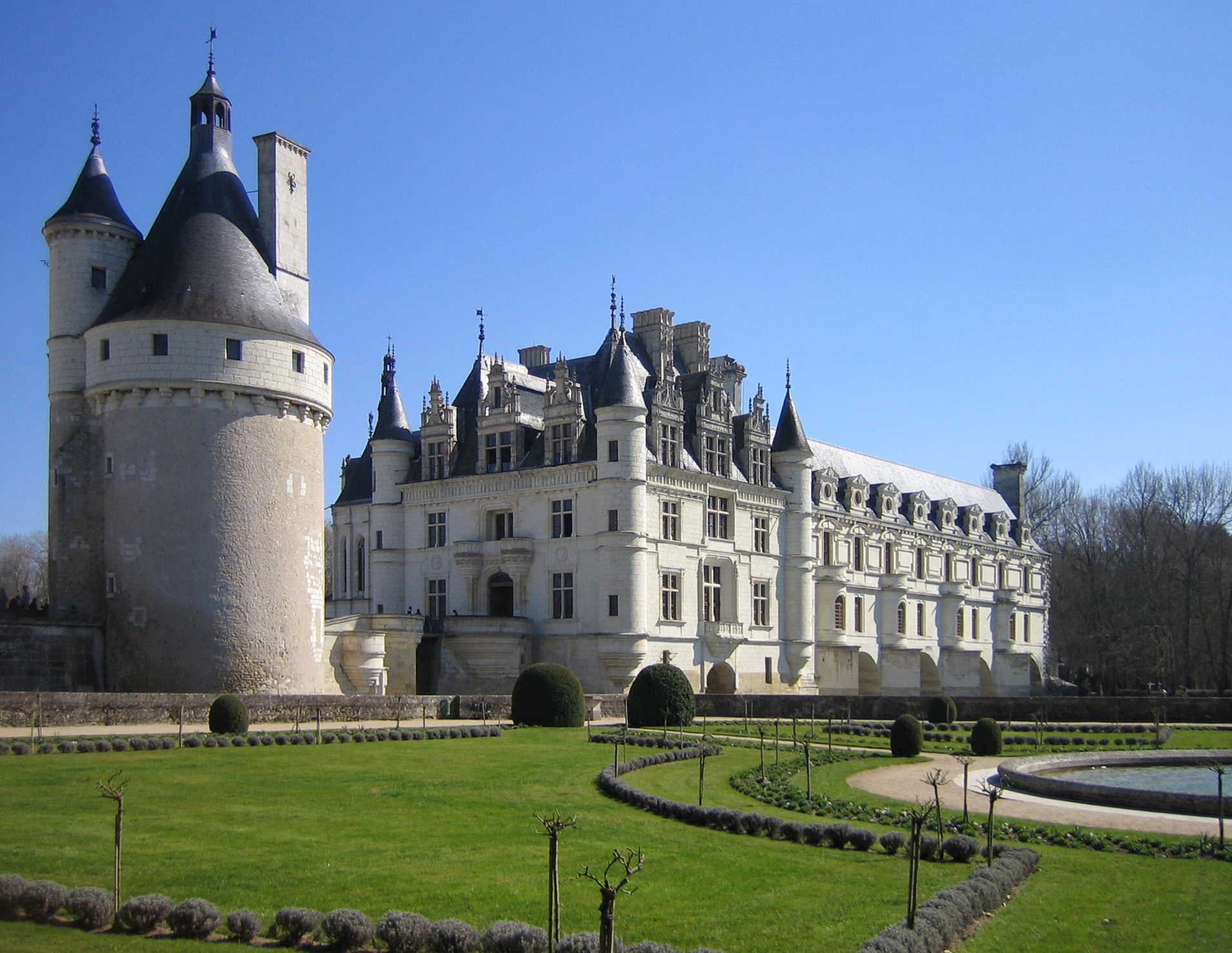
Château de Chenonceau (1515-1521), designed by Philibert de l'Orme

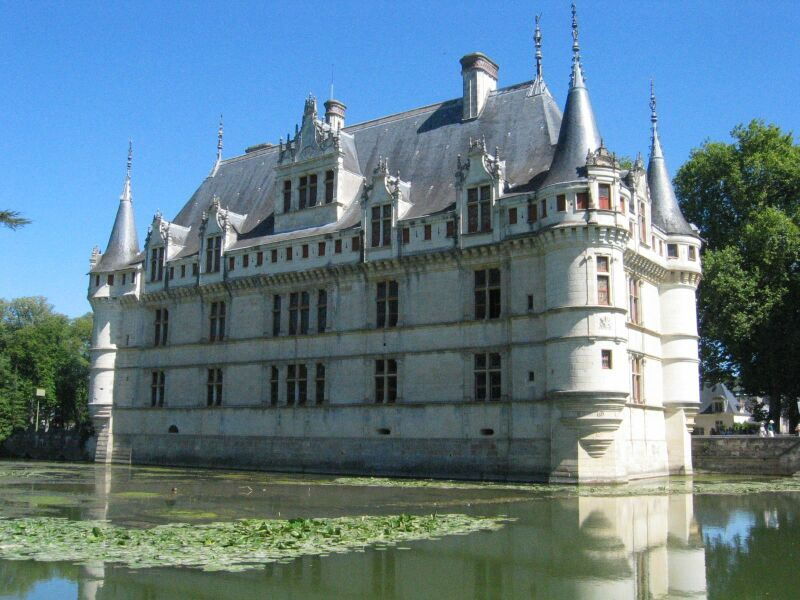
Château d'Azay-le-Rideau (1518–1527)

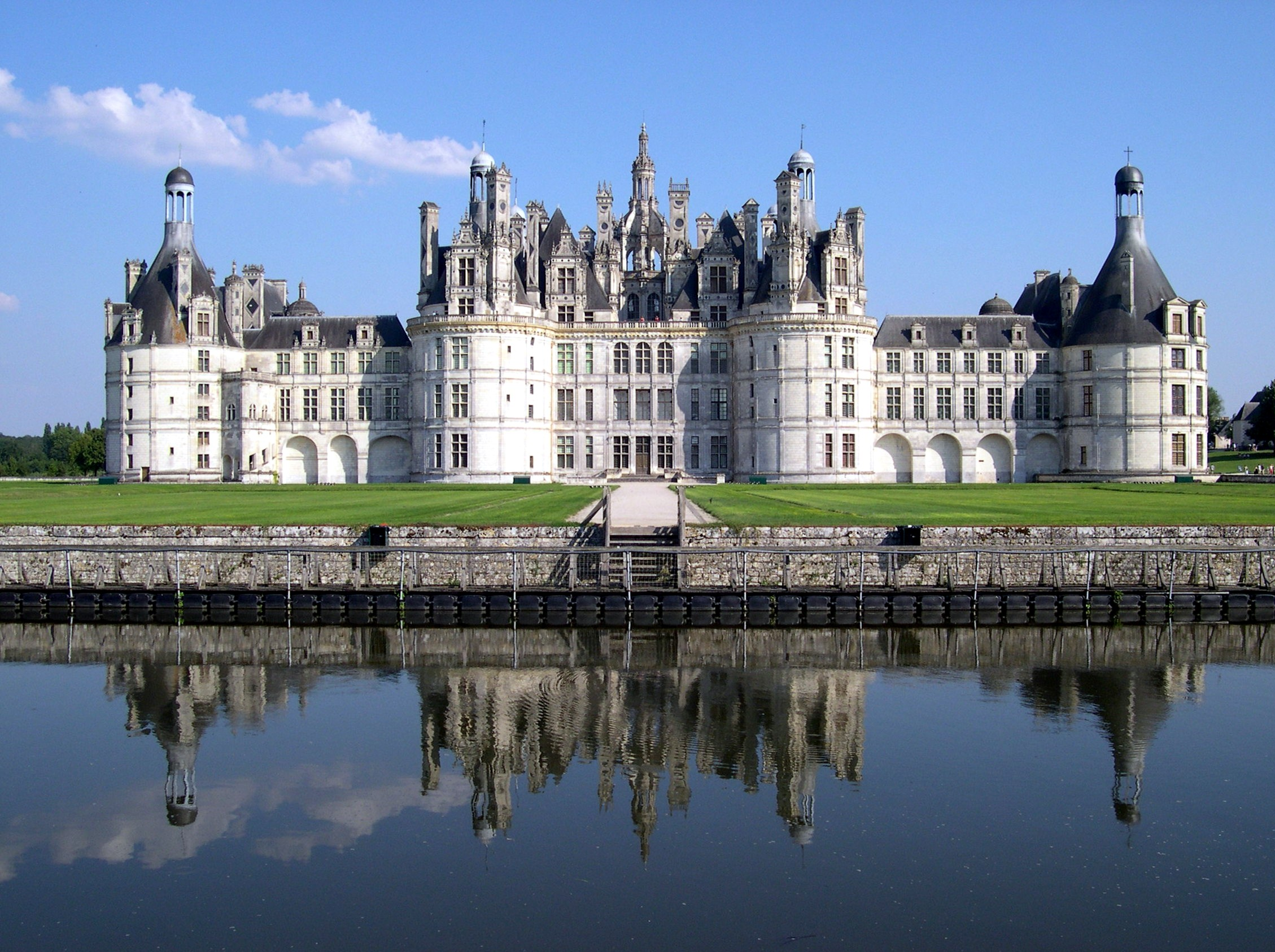
Château de Chambord (1519–1547)

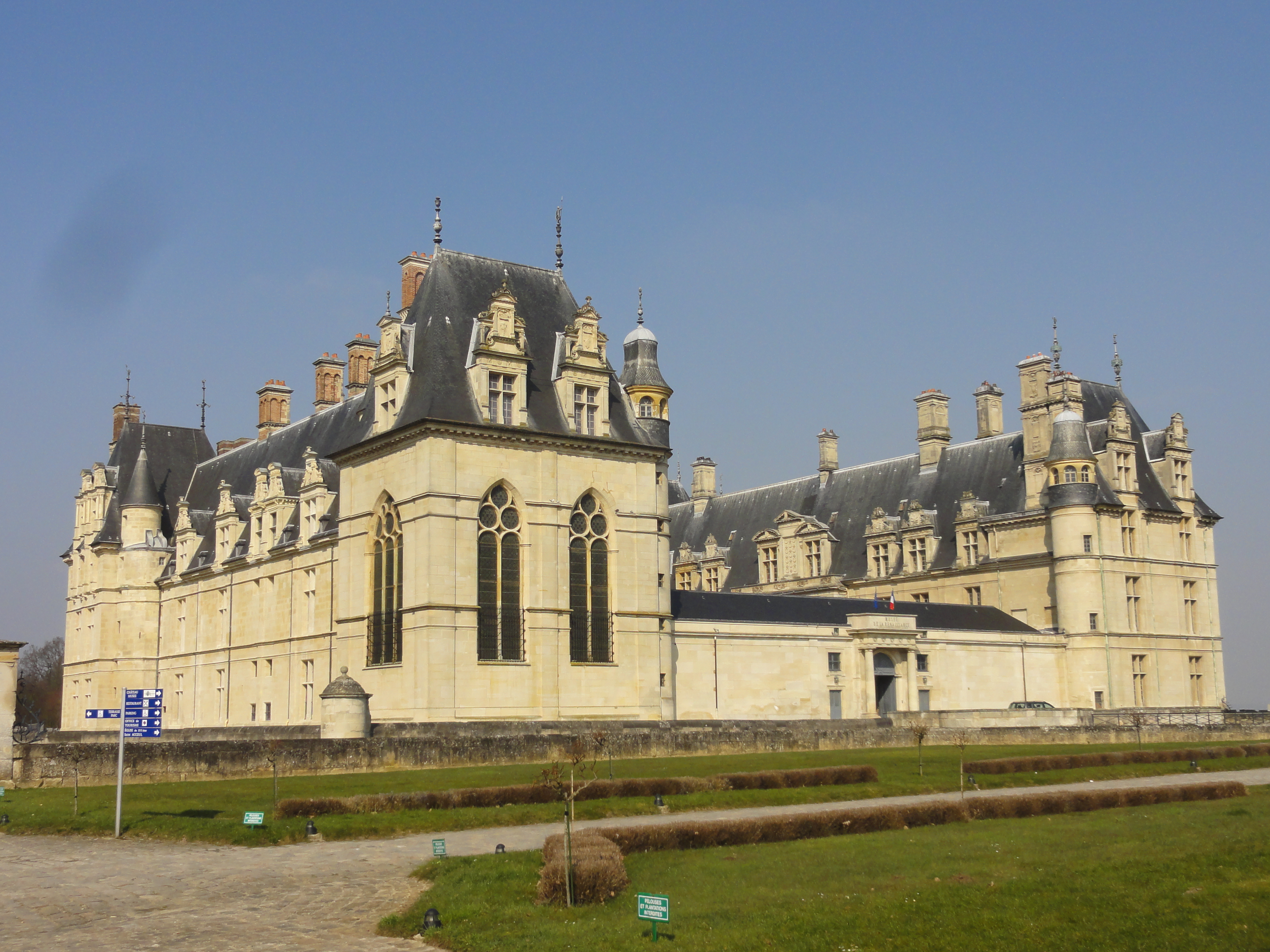
Château d'Écouen (1538–1550)

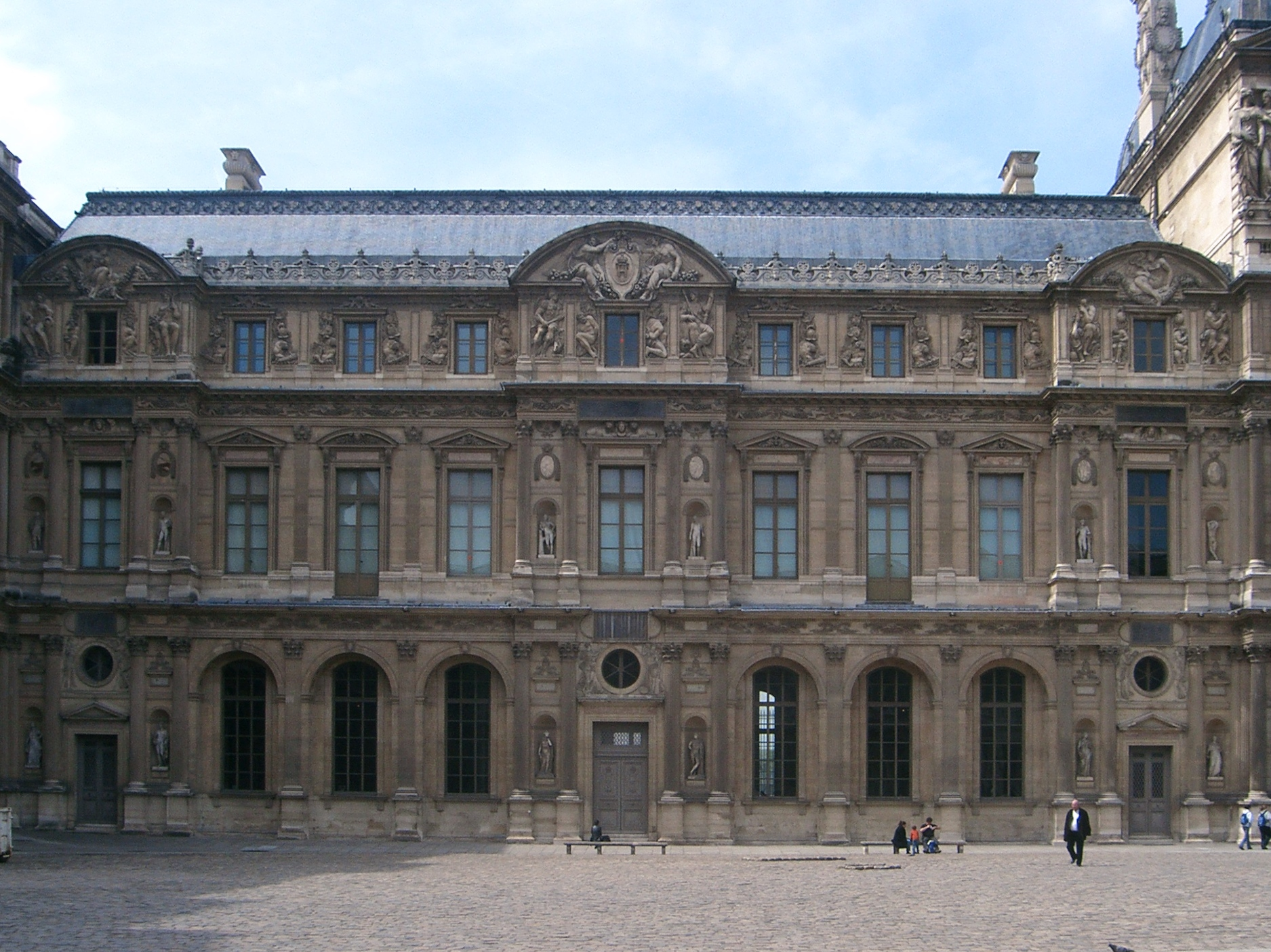
The Pierre Lescot wing of the Louvre (1546–1556)

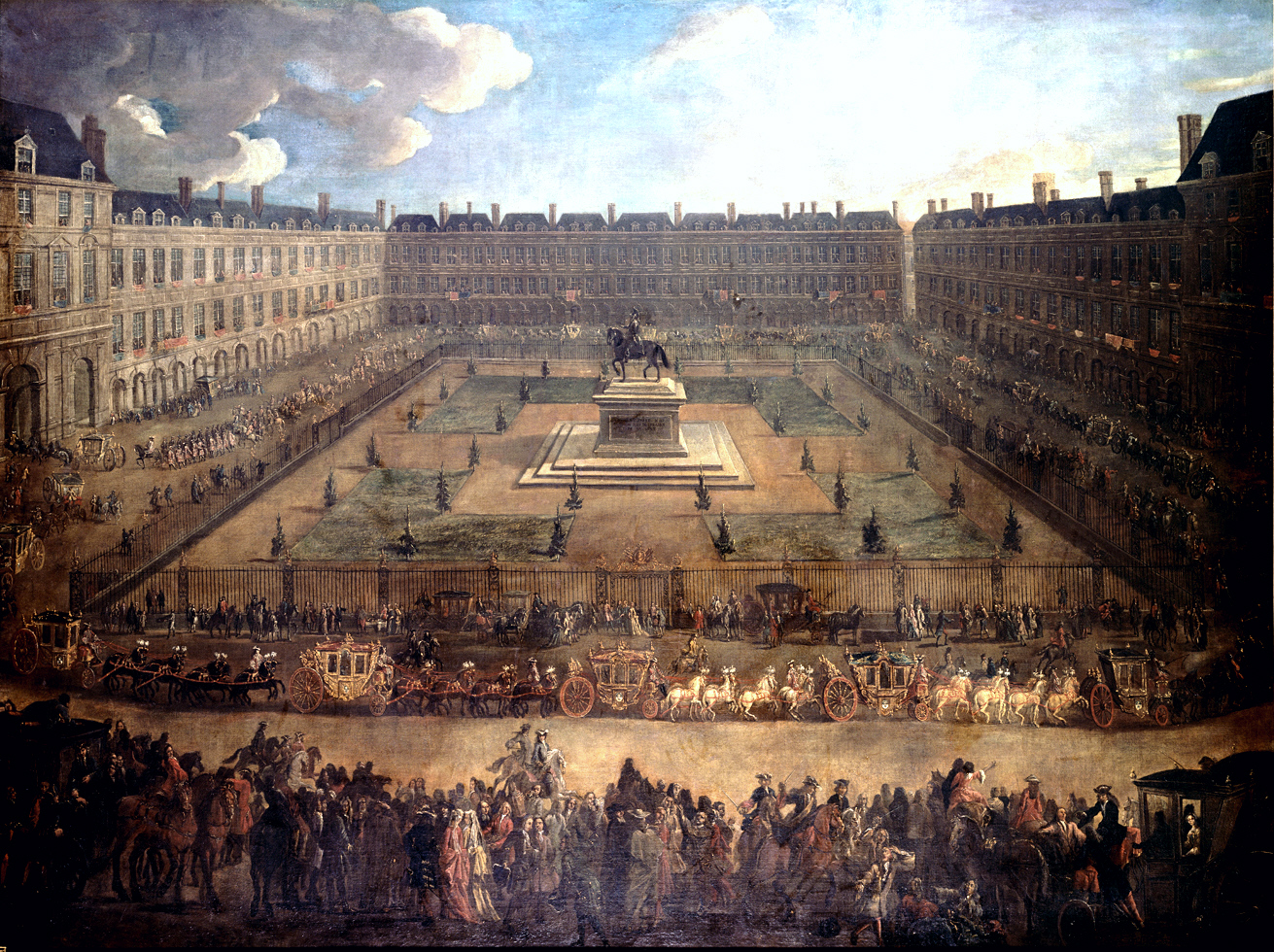
Place des Vosges (1605–1612)

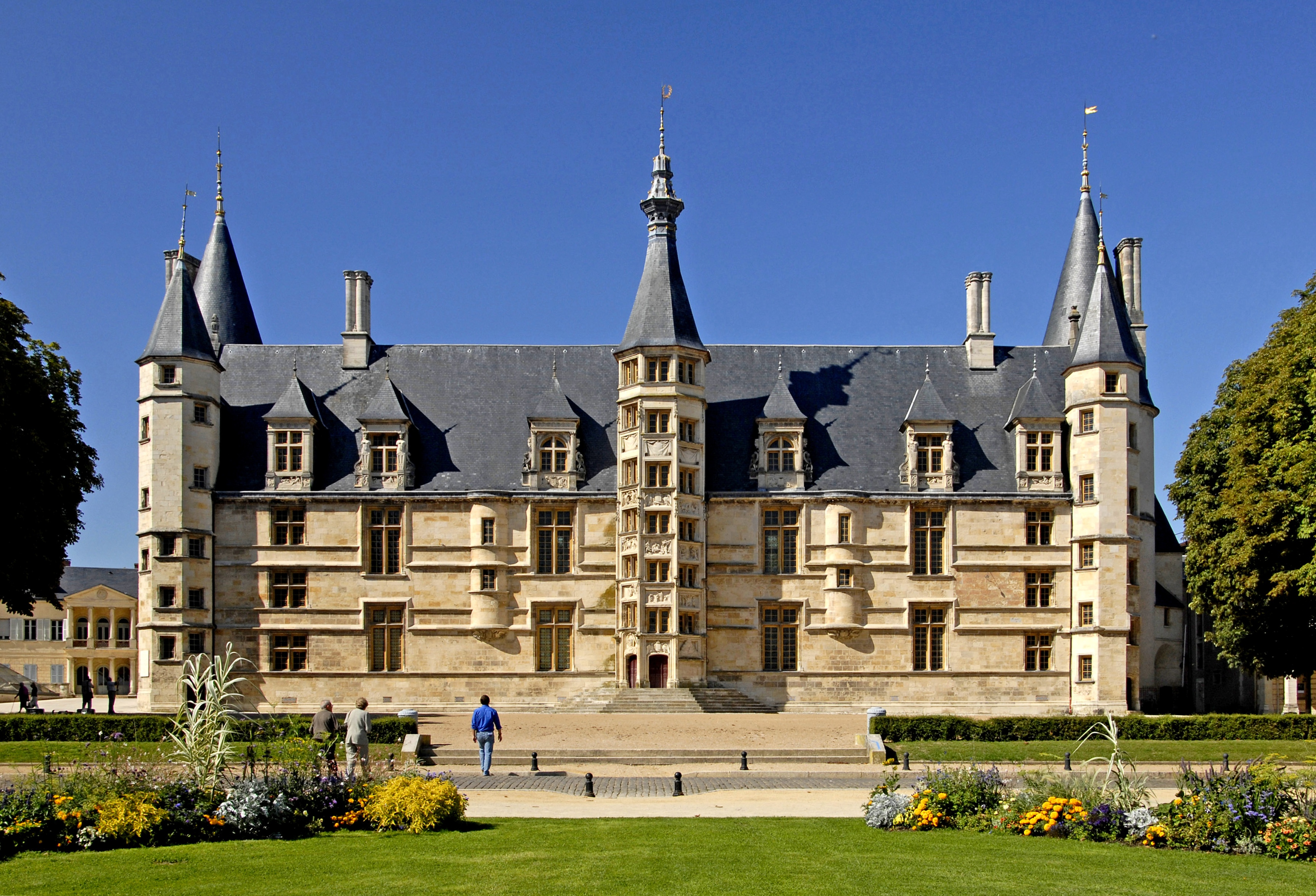
Palais ducal de Nevers

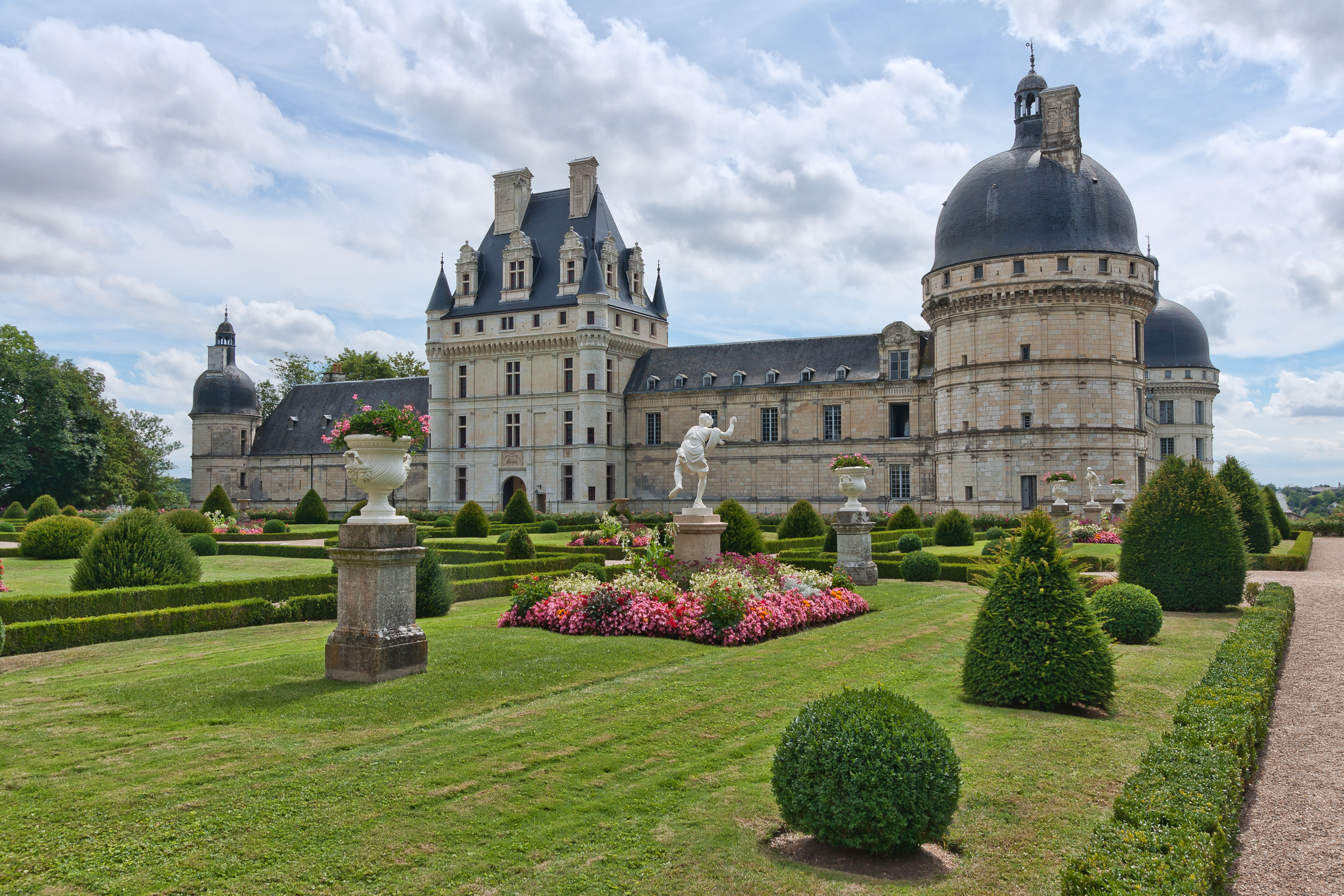
Château de Valençay

== Garden ==
French Renaissance gardens were characterized by symmetrical and geometric planting beds or parterres; plants in pots; paths of gravel and sand; terraces; stairways and ramps; moving water in the form of canals, cascades and monumental fountains, and extensive use of artificial grottes, labyrinths and statues of mythological figures. They became an extension of the chateaux that they surrounded, and were designed to illustrate the Renaissance ideals of measure and proportion.

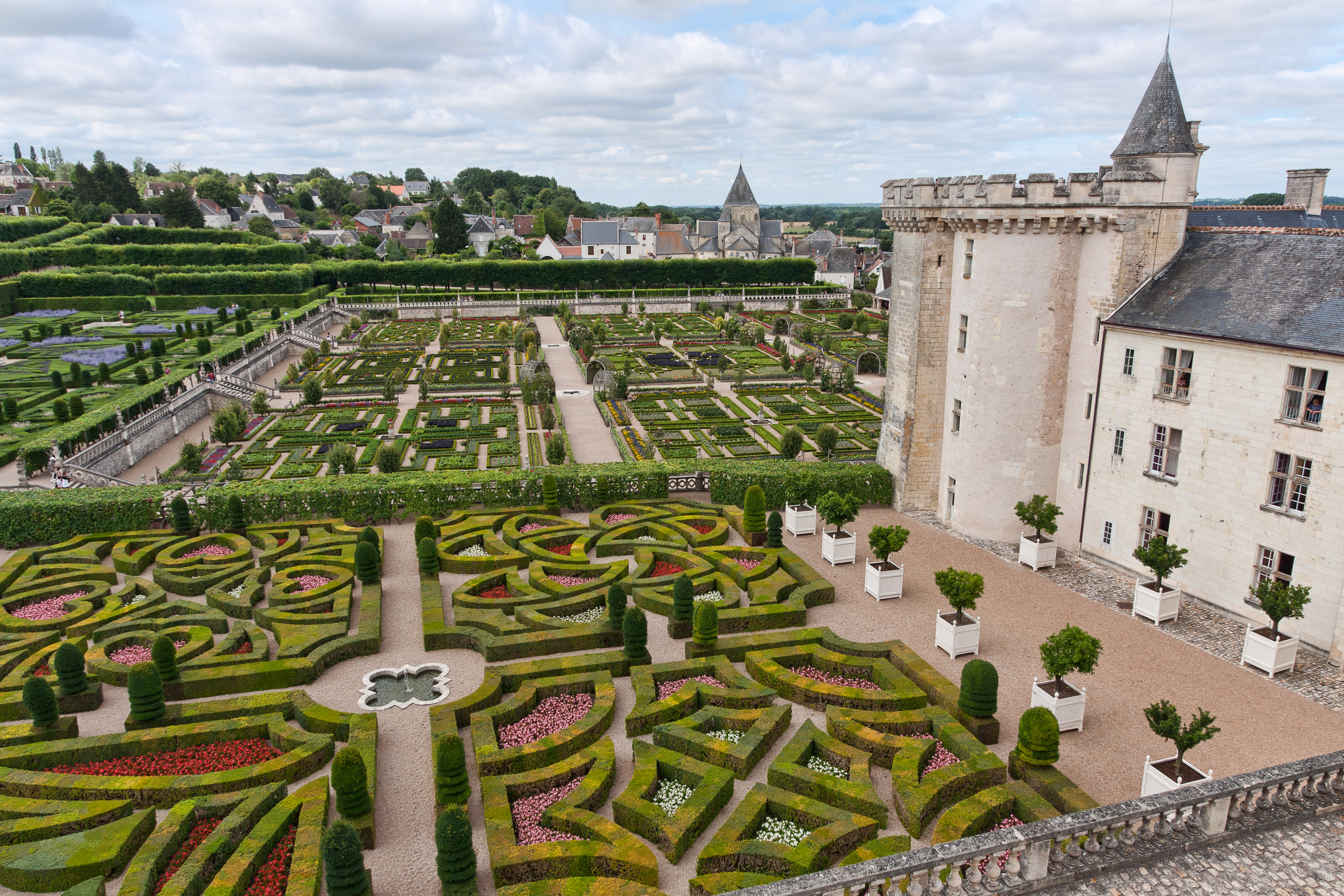
Gardens of the Château de Villandry

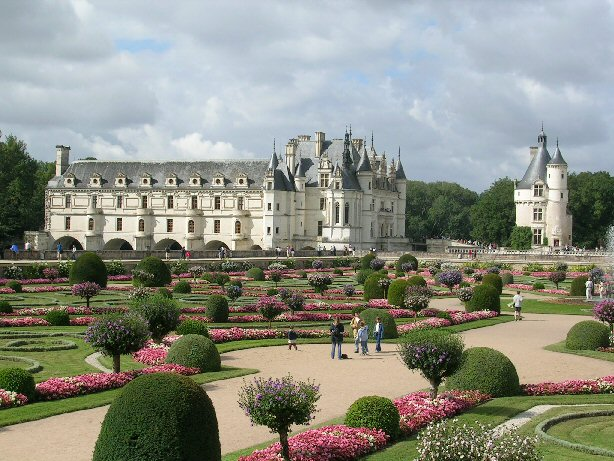
Diane de Poitiers' garden from the Château de Chenonceau

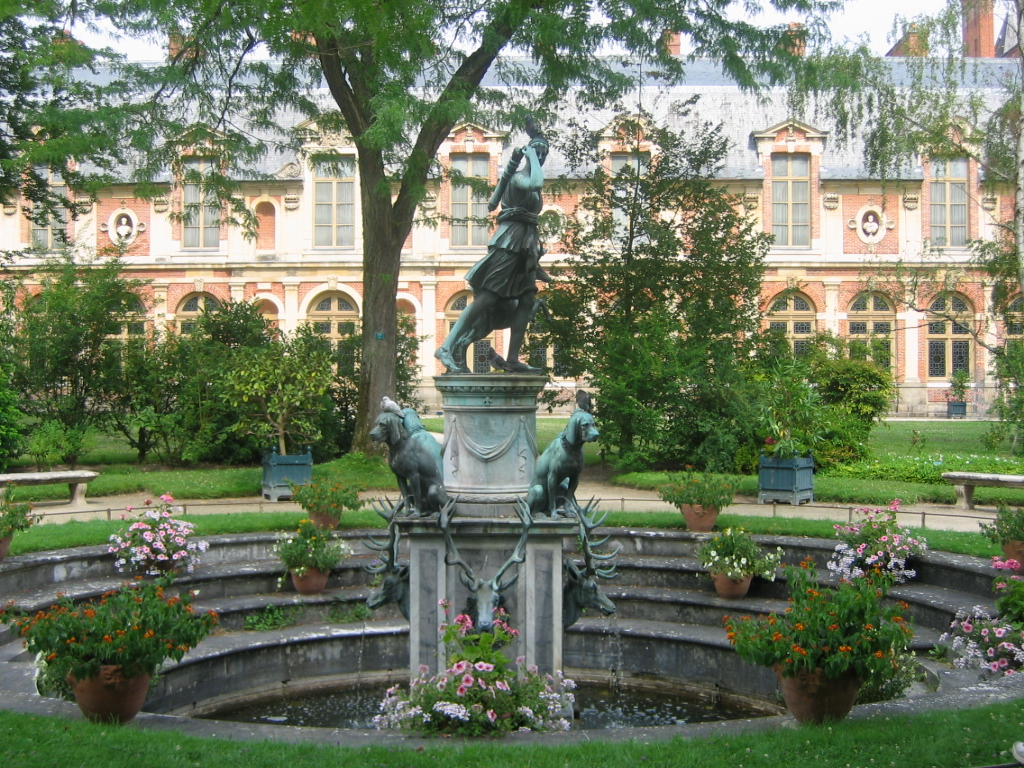
Fountain of Diana, in the gardens of the Château de Fontainebleau

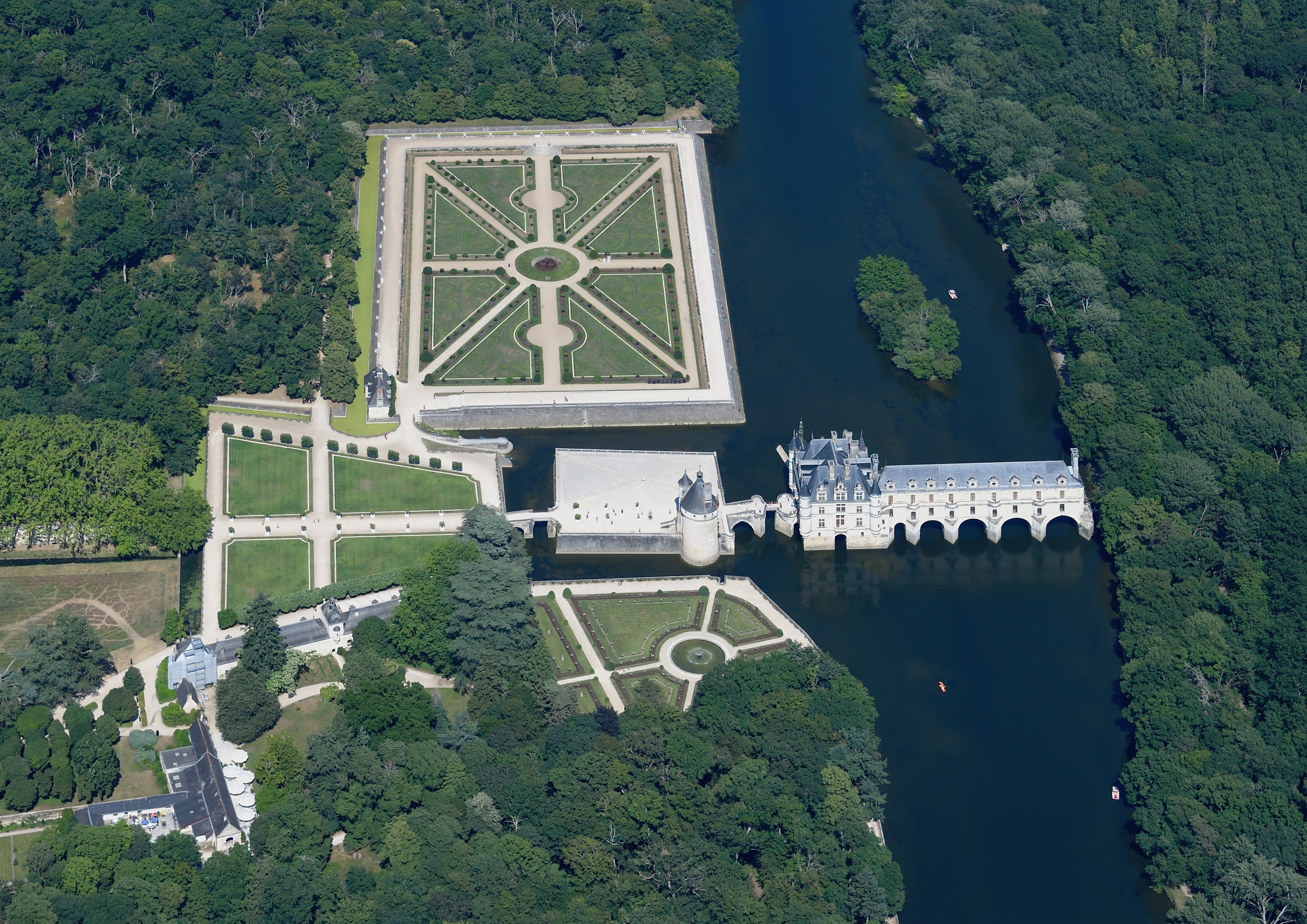
Aerial view of Château de Chenonceau and its gardens

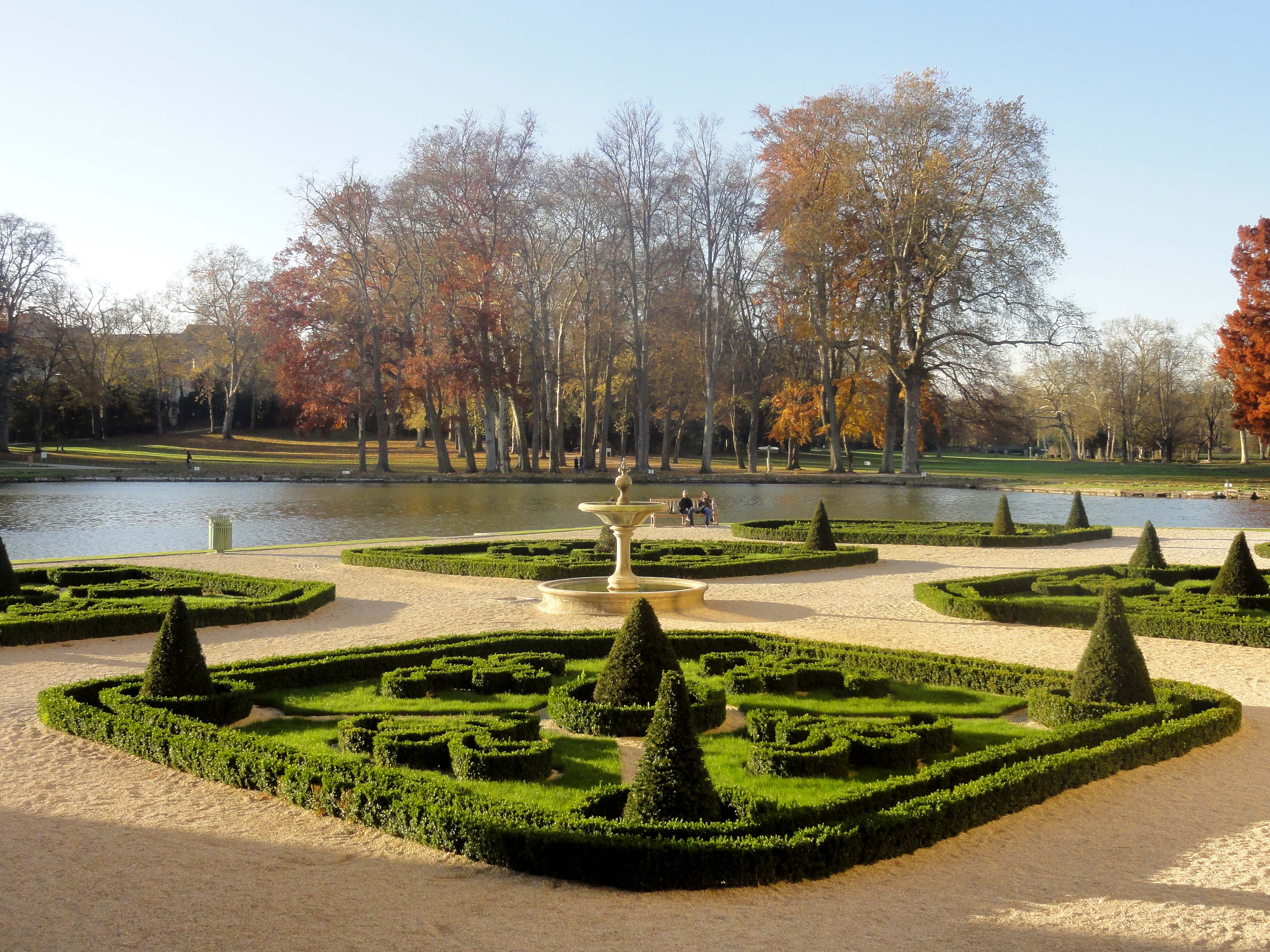
Jardin de la volière at Château de Chantilly

== Music ==
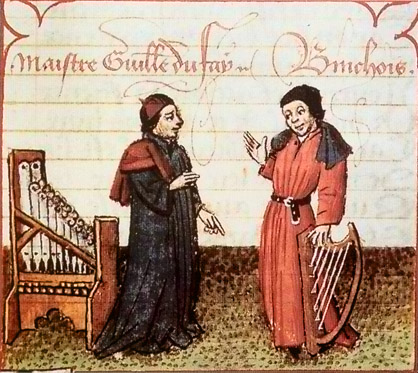
Guillaume Du Fay (left) and Gilles Binchois

Burgundy, the mostly French-speaking area unified with the Kingdom of France in 1477. Many of the most famous musicians in Europe either came from Burgundy, or went to study with composers there; in addition there was considerable interchange between the Burgundian court musical establishment and French courts and ecclesiastical organizations in the late 15th century. The Burgundian style gave birth to the Franco-Flemish style of polyphony which dominated European music in the late 15th and early 16th centuries. However, by the end of the 15th century, a French national character was becoming distinct in music of the French royal and aristocratic courts, as well as the major centers of church music. For the most part French composers of the time shunned the sombre colors of the Franco-Flemish style and strove for clarity of line and structure, and, in secular music such as the chanson, lightness, singability, and popularity. Guillaume Du Fay and Gilles Binchois are two notable examples from the Burgundian school during the early Renaissance period.

The most renowned composer in Europe, Josquin des Prez, worked for a time in the court of Louis XII, and likely composed some of his most famous works there (his first setting of Psalm 129, De profundis, was probably written for the funeral of Louis XII in 1515). Francis I, who became king that year, made the creation of an opulent musical establishment a priority. His musicians went with him on his travels, and he competed with Henry VIII at the Field of the Cloth of Gold in 1520 for the most magnificent musical entertainment; likely the event was directed by Jean Mouton, one of the most famous motet composers of the early 16th century after Josquin.

By far the most significant contribution of France to music in the Renaissance period was the chanson. The chanson was a variety of secular song, of highly varied character, and which included some of the most overwhelmingly popular music of the 16th century: indeed many chansons were sung all over Europe. The chanson in the early 16th century was characterised by a dactylic opening (long, short-short) and contrapuntal style which was later adopted by the Italian canzona, the predecessor of the sonata. Typically chansons were for three or four voices, without instrumental accompaniment, but the most popular examples were inevitably made into instrumental versions as well. Famous composers of these "Parisian" chansons included Claudin de Sermisy and Clément Janequin. Janequin's La guerre, written to celebrate the French victory at Marignano in 1515, imitates the sounds of cannon, the cries of the wounded, and the trumpets signaling advance and retreat. A later development of the chanson was the style of musique mesurée, as exemplified in the work of Claude Le Jeune: in this type of chanson, based on developments by the group of poets known as the Pléiade under Jean-Antoine de Baïf, the musical rhythm exactly matched the stress accents of the verse, in an attempt to capture some of the rhetorical effect of music in Ancient Greece (a coincident, and apparently unrelated movement in Italy at the same time was known as the Florentine Camerata). Towards the end of the 16th century the chanson was gradually replaced by the air de cour, the most popular song type in France in the early 17th century.

The era of religious wars had a profound effect on music in France. Influenced by Calvinism, the Protestants produced a type of sacred music much different from the elaborate Latin motets written by their Catholic counterparts. Both Protestants and Catholics (especially the Protestant sympathizers among them) produced a variation of the chanson known as the chanson spirituelle, which was like the secular song but was fitted with a religious or moralizing text. Claude Goudimel, a Protestant composer most noted for his Calvinist-inspired psalm settings, was murdered in Lyon during the St. Bartholomew's Day Massacre. However, not only Protestant composers were killed during the era of conflict; in 1581, Catholic Antoine de Bertrand, a prolific composer of chansons, was murdered in Toulouse by a Protestant mob.

== See also ==
- Renaissance architecture in France
- List of French Renaissance artists

- Catherine de' Medici's patronage of the arts
- Guillaume de La Perrière
- Georgette de Montenay

- Early modern France
- Late Renaissance
- Music history of France
