= Rosalind Ridley =

British psychologist and researcher (born 1949)

Ros Ridley
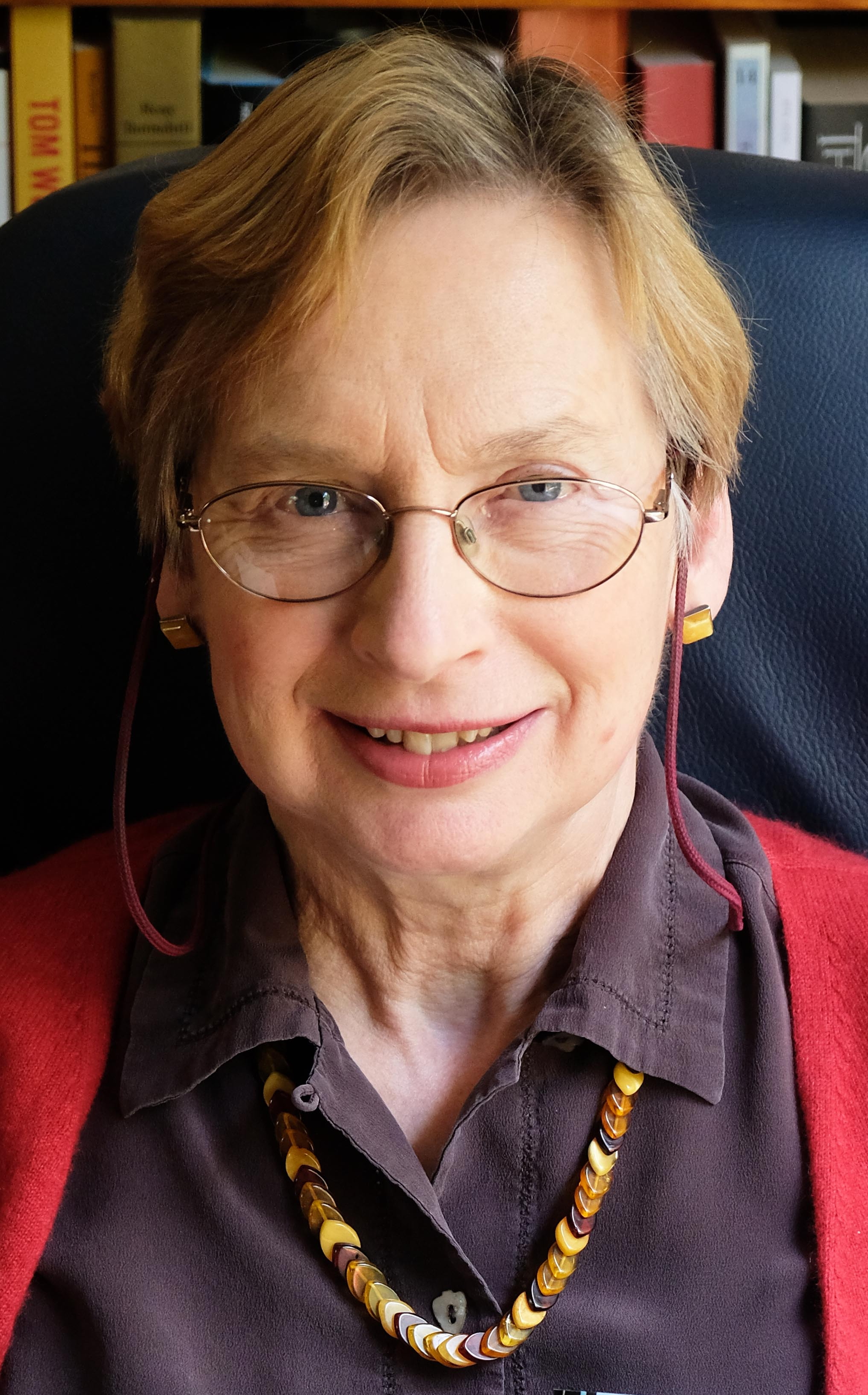
- Born: Rosalind Mary Ridley; 21 October 1949 (age 77); Coventry
- Education: Newnham College, Cambridge Institute of Psychiatry, London
- Spouse: Harry Baker
- Scientific career
- Fields: Neuropsychology Neurodegenerative Disease Prion disease
- Thesis: Responsiveness of units in part of inferotemporal and foveal prestriate cortex of the monkey during visual discrimination performance (1977)
- Doctoral advisor: George Ettlinger
- Website: sites.google.com/view/rosalindridley/home

Rosalind Ridley is a British psychologist and researcher who was head of the Medical Research Council (United Kingdom) Comparative Cognition Research Team in the Department of Psychology, Cambridge, UK, until 2005. She was a fellow of Newnham College, Cambridge from 1995–2010 and Vice-Principal from 2000–2005. She holds the privileges of a Fellow Emerita at Newnham College.

== Education and career ==
Rosalind Mary Ridley was born in Coventry, UK and educated at Barr's Hill Grammar School, Coventry and Newnham College, Cambridge University (1968-71), where she read Natural Sciences (biological), majoring in Psychology. She obtained her PhD at the Institute of Psychiatry, London under the supervision of George Ettlinger. In 1977, she joined the Clinical Research Centre, Division of Psychiatry at Northwick Park Hospital, Harrow, London.

== Research ==
Ridley's research career started with an investigation into cortical mechanisms of visual perception followed by the delineation of the cortical areas involved in somatosensory discrimination learning. Her early career involved work on the role of dopamine in cognitive perseveration and motor stereotypy, but her interests then extended to the role of the hippocampus in simple and conditional learning. Much of her research effort was directed towards developing treatments for Alzheimer's disease, Parkinson's disease and Huntington's disease. She and her research collaborators demonstrated that acetylcholine was crucial for various types of memory formation and established that transplantation of neural tissue into the brain could restore memory and learning ability. She also maintained an interest in the genetics of neurodegenerative diseases.

Ridley was involved in early work on transmissible spongiform encephalopathy (subsequently known as prion disease), particularly in the recognition that individual cases of human prion disease could be sporadic, familial or acquired and that familial cases were associated with mutations in the prion protein gene. She demonstrated the transmissibility of bovine spongiform encephalopathy (BSE) and scrapie to primates and argued that the evidence for BSE and scrapie being acquired by maternal transmission was also compatible with genetic susceptibility to disease. In experiments using data extending over 25 years, she demonstrated that the amyloid proteins found in Alzheimer's disease were self-assembling and experimentally transmissible, establishing a link in pathogenesis between prion diseases and the other neurodegenerative proteinopathies

Ridley's current research lies in aspects of cognitive psychology to be found in late nineteenth and early twentieth century books for children, especially the works of J. M. Barrie.

== Personal life ==
Ridley married her colleague, Harry Baker, in 1981 and now lives in Liverpool.

== Select bibliography ==
- Fatal Protein. The story of CJD, BSE and other prion diseases (1998) Ridley, R. M. and Baker, H. F. Oxford University Press. ISBN 0 19 852435 8
- Prion Diseases (1996) Baker, H. F. and Ridley, R. M. Eds. Humana Press Inc., Totowa, New Jersey. ISBN 0896033422
- Peter Pan and the Mind of J. M. Barrie. An Exploration of Cognition and Consciousness (2016) Ridley, R. M. Cambridge Scholars Publishing. ISBN 978-1-4438-9107-3
