= Barr's Hill School =

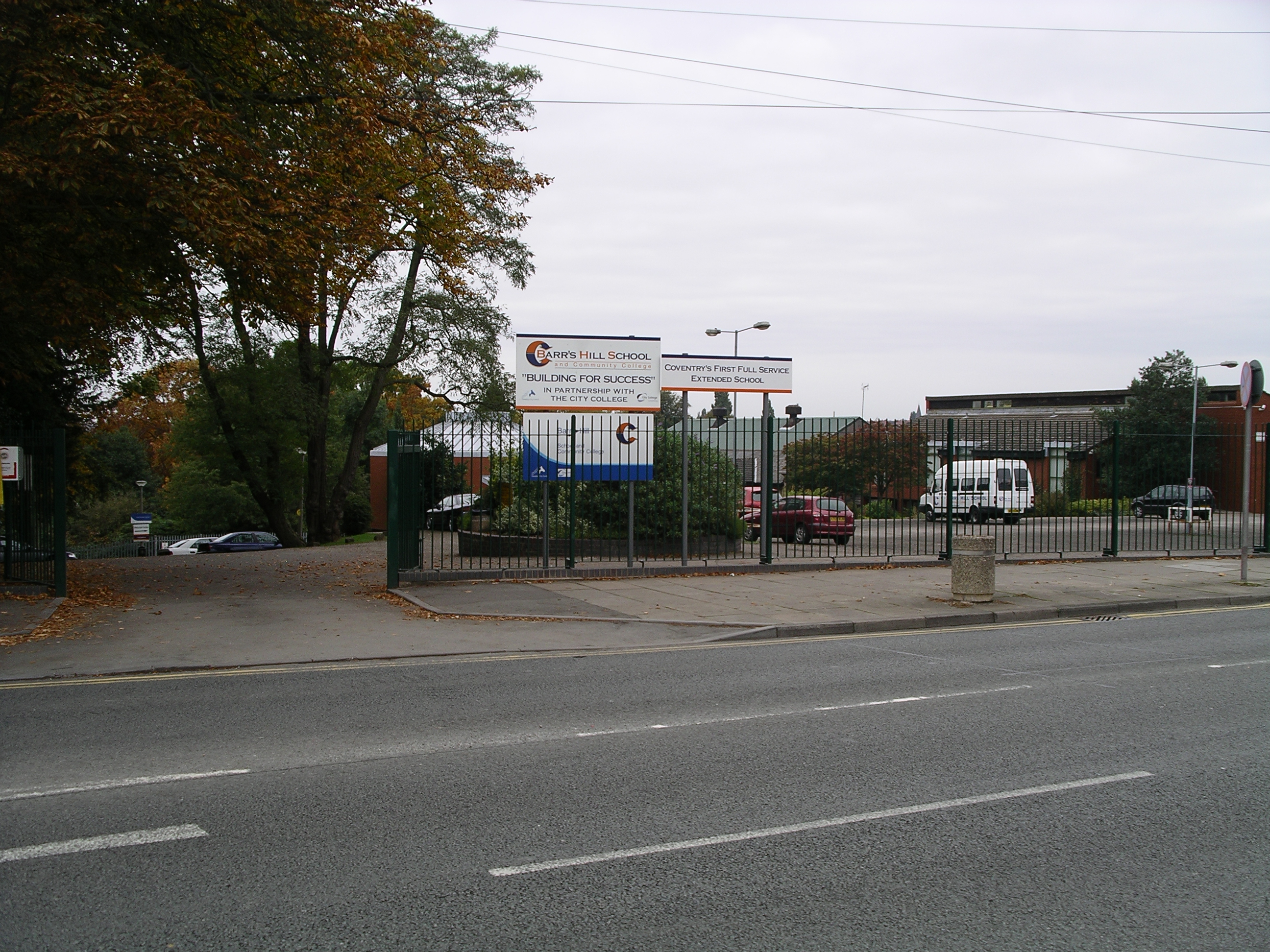

Location
- Radford Road; Coventry, West Midlands, CV1 4BU; England; 52°24′55″N 1°30′59″W

Information
- Type: Academy
- Established: October 1908
- Local authority: Coventry City Council
- Trust: The Futures Trust
- Department for Education URN: 142339 Tables
- Ofsted: Reports
- Headteacher: Chris Jupp
- Gender: Mixed
- Age: 11 to 18
- Enrolment: 1000
- Colours: Navy and light blue
- Former name: Barr's Hill Grammar School
- Website: http://www.barrshill.coventry.sch.uk

Barr's Hill School is a mixed secondary school and sixth form located in Radford, Coventry, England.

== History ==
Barr's Hill School was founded in 1908 as a girls' grammar school in Coventry. Over the years, it transitioned into a mixed comprehensive school. In 2015, Barr's Hill School became part of The Futures Trust, a multi-academy trust.

== Curriculum and Enrichment ==
The curriculum is supplemented by extracurricular activities, including:

• Sports Teams: Opportunities for students to participate in competitive sports, with facilities for football, athletics, and more.

• Performing Arts: Extensive music tuition programme, drama productions, and the annual Futures Trust Arts Festival.

• Academic Competitions: Participation in various academic challenges and clubs, such as debate and public speaking.

• Leadership Initiatives: Programs like student leadership teams, mentoring, and community service projects.

== Notable alumni ==
- Susan Hill, author
- Jane A. Langdale, geneticist
- Ann Moss, scholar of French literature
- Jennie Page, civil servant and chief executive of the Millennium Dome project
- Sara Parkin, political activist
- Rosalind Ridley, psychologist
- Alison Rose, British ambassador to Belgium 2014-2019
