= Richard Sayce =

Richard Anthony Sayce (11 January 1917 – 11 August 1977) was a British academic in the field of French literature, becoming Reader in French Literature at the University of Oxford.

== Life ==
Sayce was born on 11 January 1917. After attending Builth County Grammar School in Breconshire, Wales, he studied French and German at Jesus College, Oxford, obtaining a first-class honours degree; he studied at the University of Paris from 1938 to 1939. During the Second World War, he served as a captain in the King's Own Yorkshire Light Infantry, and then became a lecturer at the University of Oxford. His main area of interest was historical bibliography, and his works included Style in French prose and The French Biblical Epic in the Seventeenth Century (1955). He was also an expert on Montaigne. He was a Fellow of Worcester College, Oxford, where he was also the college librarian, and was appointed Reader in French Literature by the university. He died on 11 August 1977.
