= Florentine Renaissance art =

Renaissance art in Florence

Florentine Renaissance
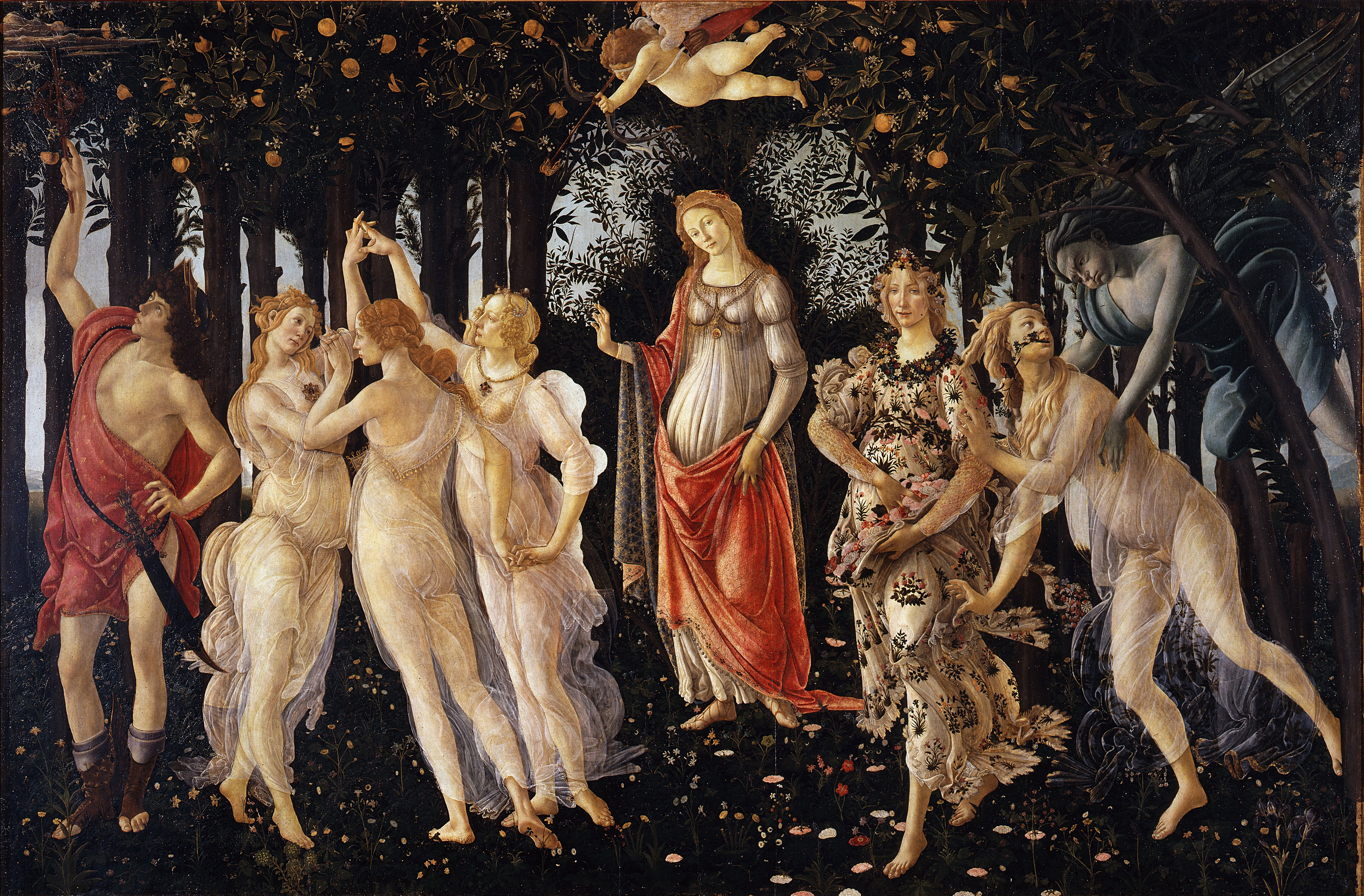
- Sandro Botticelli, Primavera (c. 1478)
- Years active: Early 15th to late 16th century
- Location: Republic of Florence
- Major figures: Painting: Masaccio, Leonardo da Vinci, Michelangelo, Raphael. Architecture: Lorenzo Ghiberti, Leon Battista Alberti, Filarete Sculpture: Andrea del Verrocchio, Filippo Brunelleschi, Donatello, Michelangelo,

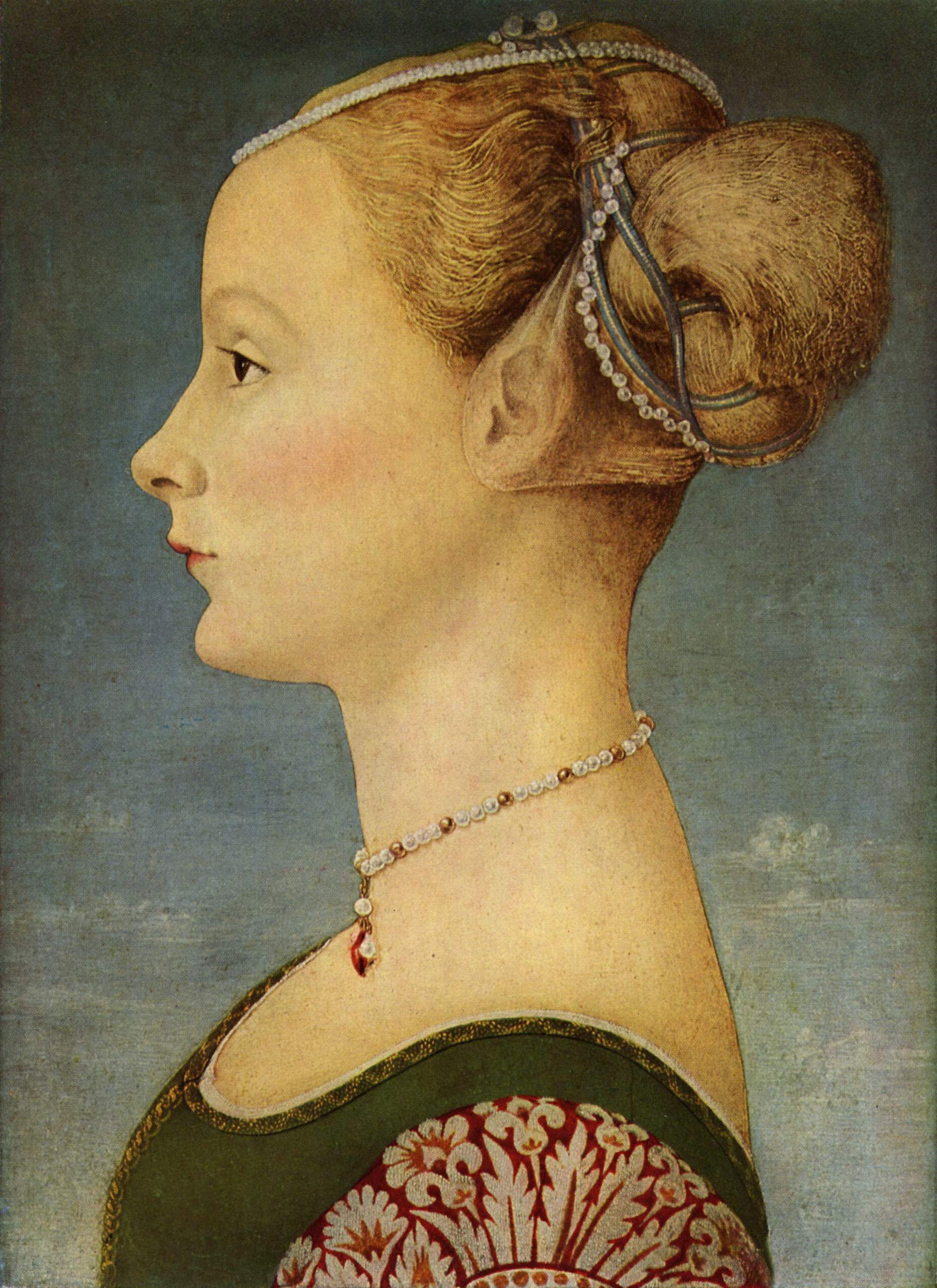
Antonio del Pollaiuolo, Portrait of a Young Woman (1470–1472), Museo Poldi Pezzoli, Milan.

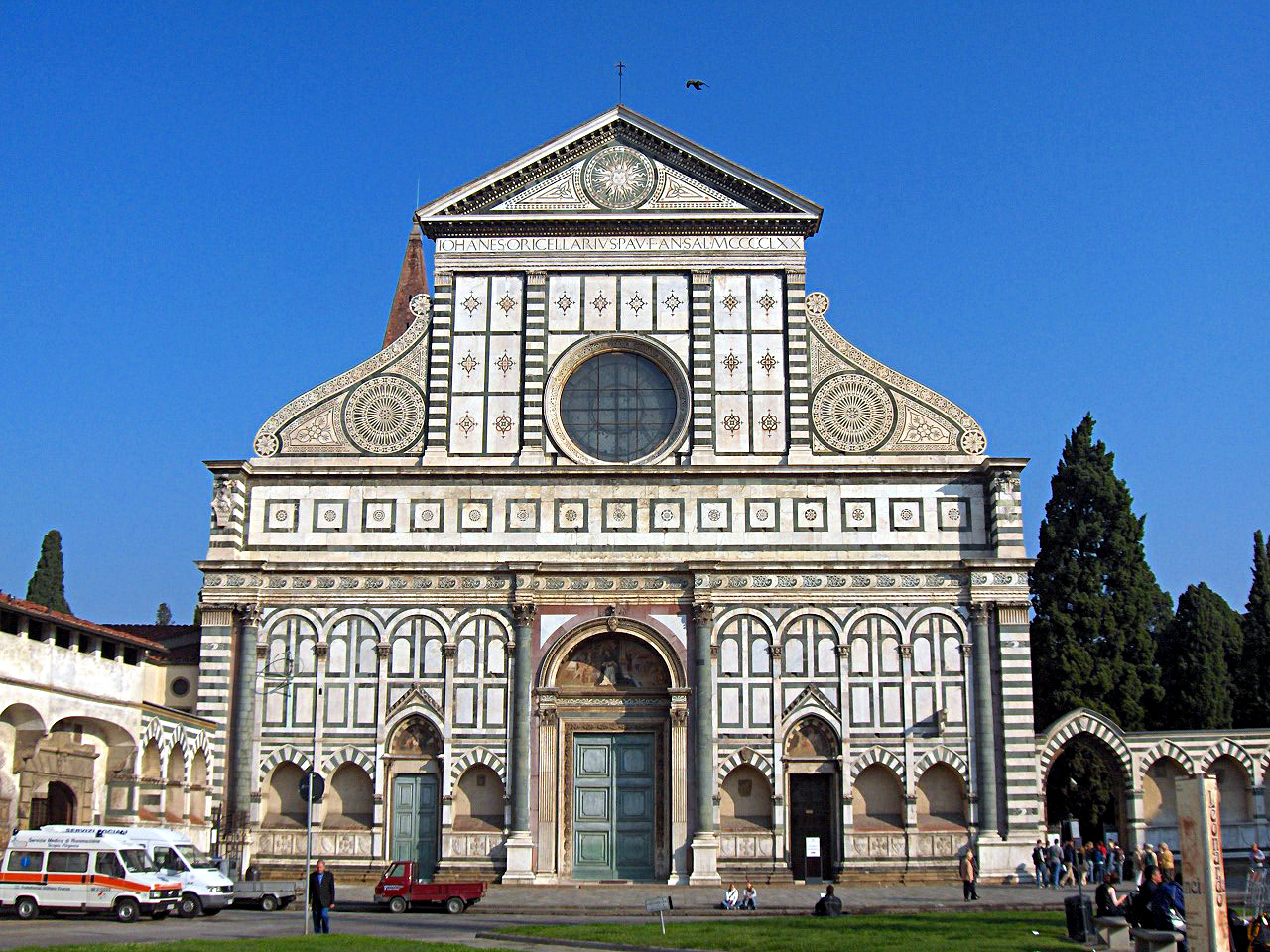
Facade of Santa Maria Novella (1456)

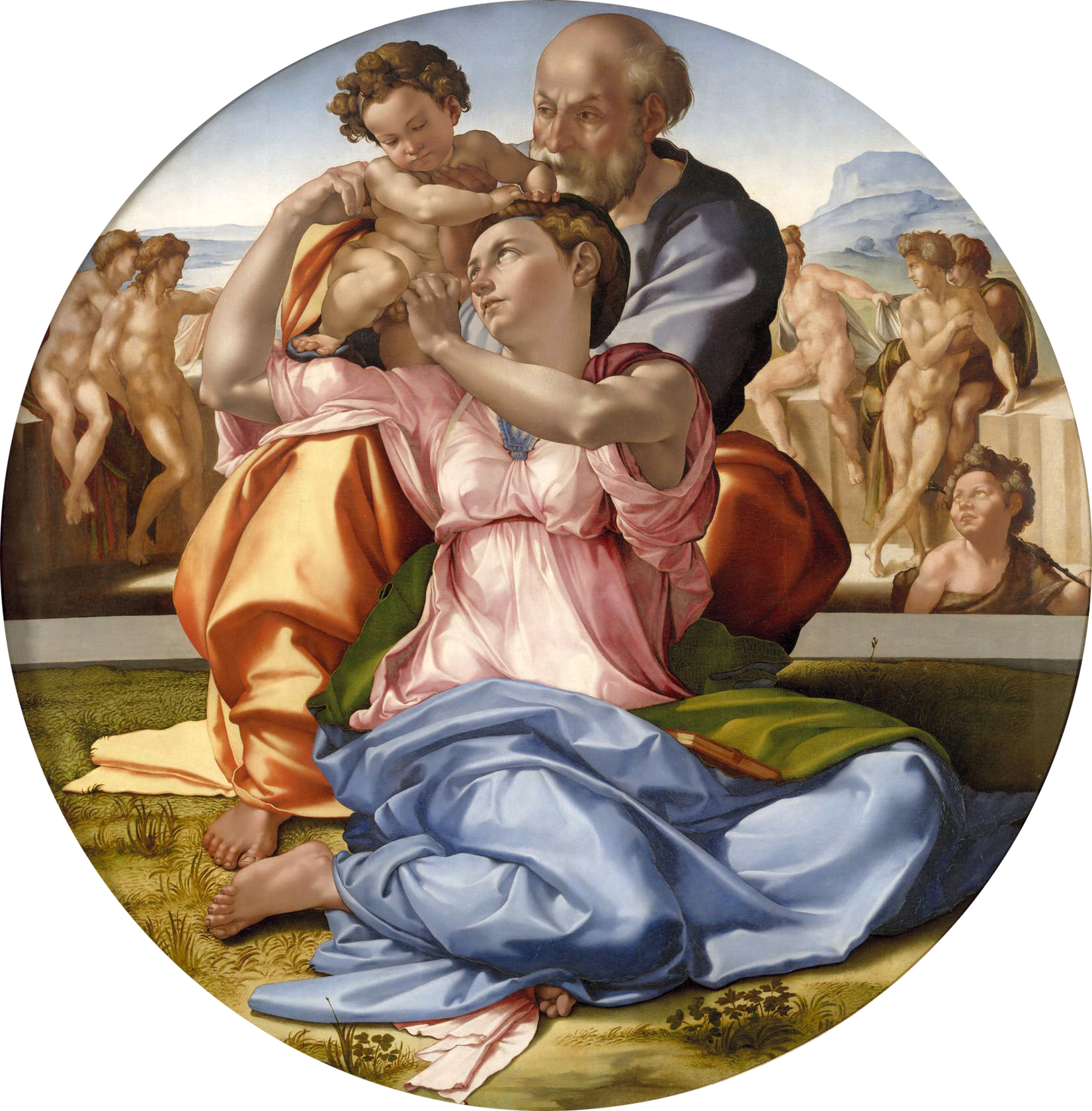
Michelangelo, Doni Tondo (1503–1504)

The Florentine Renaissance in art is the new approach to art and culture in Florence during the period from approximately the beginning of the 15th century to the end of the 16th. This new figurative language was linked to a new way of thinking about humankind and the world around it, based on the local culture and humanism already highlighted in the 14th century by Petrarch and Coluccio Salutati, among others. Filippo Brunelleschi, Donatello and Masaccio's innovations in the figurative arts at the very beginning of the 15th century were not immediately accepted by the community, and for some twenty years remained misunderstood and in the minority compared to International Gothic.

Thereafter, the figurative language of the Renaissance gradually became the most popular and was transmitted to other Italian courts, including the papal court, as well as to European courts, thanks to the movement of artists from one court to another. Contact with these travellers gave rise to local disciples.

The Florentine Renaissance was divided into several periods. Until the middle of the 15th century, this movement was based on technical and practical approaches, then a second phase covering the period of Lorenzo de' Medici's reign, from 1450 to 1492, was characterised by mainly intellectual contributions. The third phase was shaped by the precepts of Girolamo Savonarola, who had a profound and lasting influence on many artists, calling into question freedom of choice through the establishment of a theocratic state in Florence. From 1490 to 1520, the High Renaissance corresponds to the period of "experimentation" by the three major figures of the Renaissance: Leonardo da Vinci, Michelangelo and Raphael. The art of the period which followed is known as Mannerism.

== Historical context ==
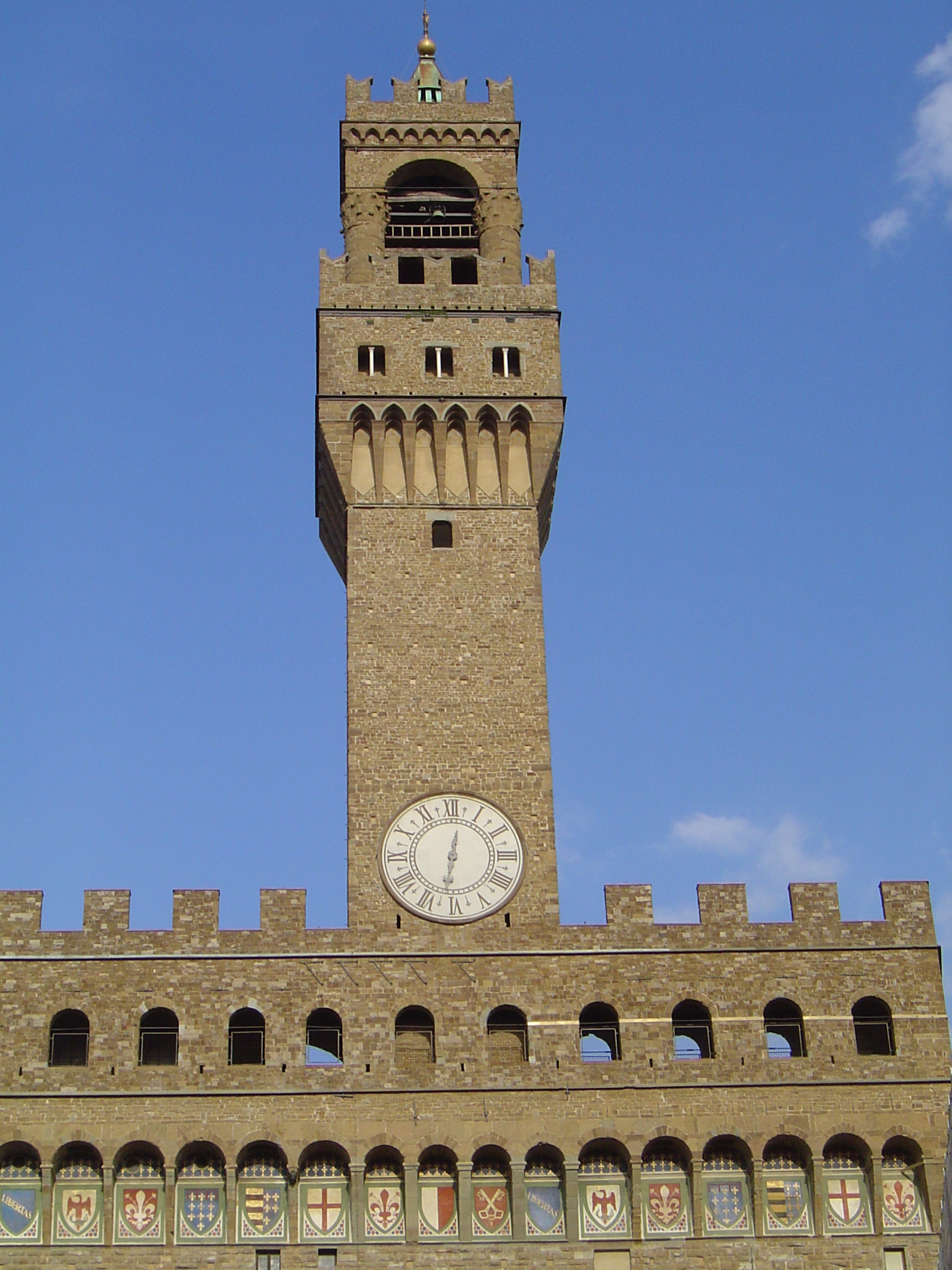
The Torre di Arnolfo and the coats of arms of the Palazzo Vecchio (early 15th century).

=== Late 14th – first half of the 15th century ===
After the economic and social crisis of the second half of the 14th century, caused by bank failures, the Black Death, famine and civil wars culminating in the Ciompi Revolt of 1378, an economic recovery began in Florence. The population began to grow, and public works began again under the initiative of the bourgeois oligarchy. In 1391, construction began on the Porta della Mandorla at the Duomo. In 1404, the Arti decorated the outer niches of Orsanmichele.

The recovery was threatened by Gian Galeazzo Visconti, who laid siege to Florence with the aim of creating a national state in Italy under the domination of Milan. Nevertheless, the Florentines held on to their independence. With the death of Visconti in 1402 and the loosening of the military stranglehold on the city, economic recovery resumed and Florence conquered Pisa in 1406 and the port of Livorno in 1421. In 1424, Florence suffered defeat at the hands of the Visconti and of Lucca. The burden of war and the cost of completing the cathedral dome necessitated new taxes. Thus, in 1427, the Signoria imposed the catasto, taxing families according to their wealth, i.e. at the time taxing the families of merchant bankers.

=== Medici seigneury ===
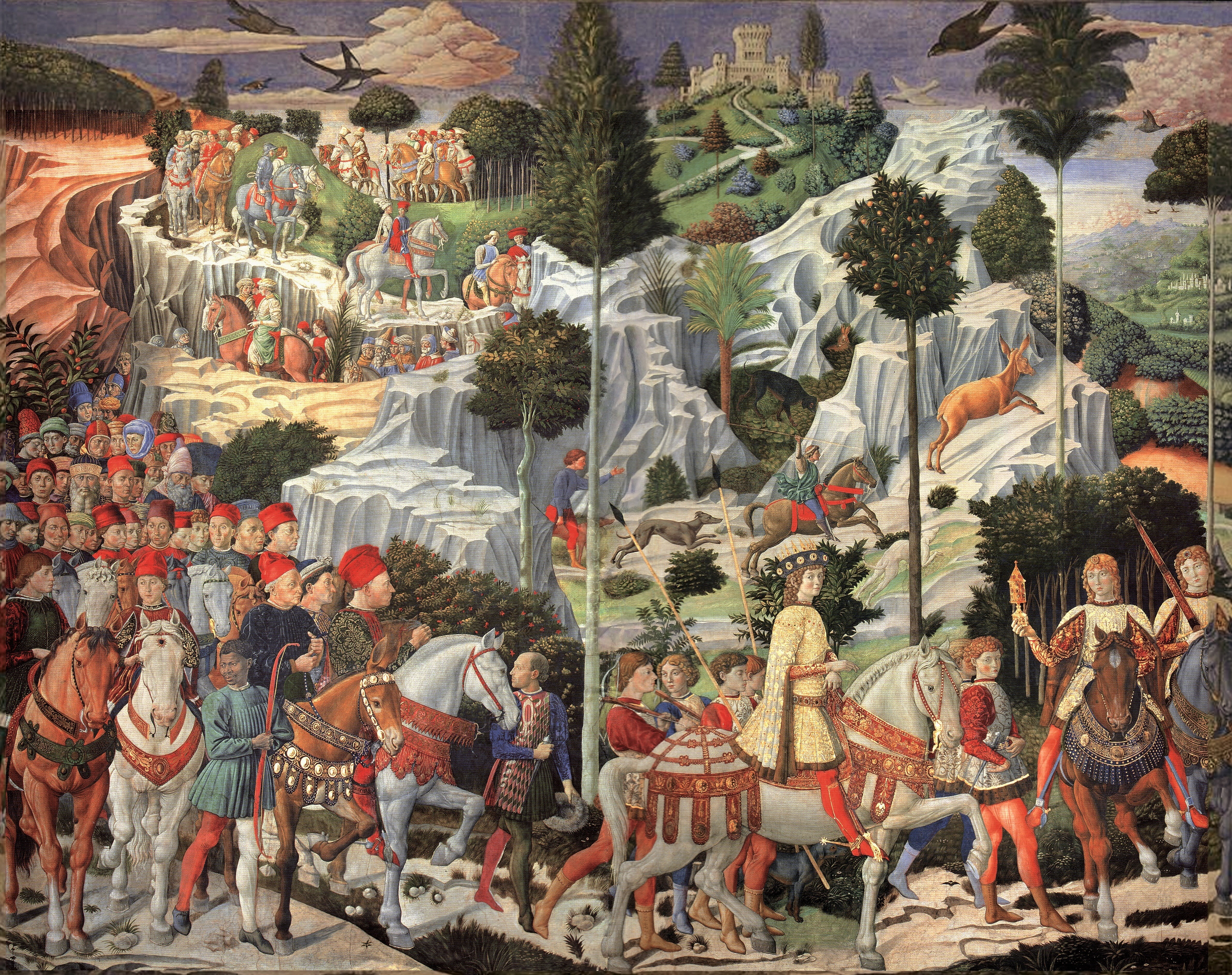
Benozzo Gozzoli, fresco in the Magi Chapel (1459), a celebration of the Medici family's power.

During the 1430s, Cosimo de' Medici began to take political action, bringing in men he trusted, while he remained in the second line, but the confrontation with Florence's other powerful families, such as the Albizzi and the Strozzi backfired on him and he was forced into exile. Nevertheless, the dissatisfied population (Note: The Florentine public's disavowal of the ancient oligarchs was legitimized in particular by the multiple tax levies attributable to the financial costs of the wars of the 1420s, but also to the investments made in new monumental edifices.) chased away his enemies and forced his return. Received with acclaim, he was dubbed Pater Patriae. From then on, the Medici family took power and held it for three centuries.

In 1439, with Cosimo reigning, the Church council held in Ferrara was transferred to Florence because of the plague. Although this council aimed to settle the problem of the Eastern schism, its concrete result was hardly visible.

The reign of Lorenzo de' Medici, in power from 1469 to 1492, after a difficult start with the Pazzi conspiracy, was a period of peace, prosperity and cultural refinement. Florence became an influential centre, exporting its art and know-how to the other courts of Italy and Europe by sending its artists and scholars as ambascerie culturali ('cultural ambassadors'). The first decoration of the Sistine Chapel in Rome was the work of a group of Florentine artists, including Sandro Botticelli, Domenico Ghirlandaio and Pietro Perugino.

After Lorenzo's death, a dark era began with the appearance of Girolamo Savonarola, who, after the exile of Piero the Unfortunate, established the Republic and created a theocratically inspired state. His proclamations from the pulpit of San Marco had a profound influence on Florentine society, which, fearful of the political crisis sweeping the Italian peninsula, turned to a more austere, fundamentalist religion, in contrast to the humanist ideals inspired by the classical world which had run through the preceding period. Many artists, such as Botticelli and the young Michelangelo, abandoned creations of "profane inspiration", sometimes (as in the cases of Fra Bartolomeo and Botticelli) destroying their earlier productions, which were burnt at the bonfire of the vanities.

The confrontation between Savonarola and Pope Alexander VI put an end to the influence of Savonarola, who was condemned as a heretic and burned in the Piazza della Signoria in 1498. From then on, the social situation became even more confused, and many artists left the city.

Meanwhile, Lorenzo de' Medici's son Giovanni, now a cardinal, intimidated the population with the Sack of Prato in 1512, and was given the keys to the city. He became pope under the name of Leo X in 1513, and governed the city from Rome through members of his family.

In 1527, the Sack of Rome sparked a new rebellion. The Siege of Florence in 1529–1530 put an end to the Florentine Republic, which became a duchy under Cosimo I of Tuscany, who became Grand Duke after the conquest of Siena, making Florence the capital of Tuscany.

=== Guild influence ===
The Medici were bankers, not soldiers raised on chivalric ideals, and many of their commissions were more deliberately aristocratic than those of their princely counterparts. Many of the skills that gave Florentine art its distinctive form, such as practical mathematics, letters and numbers, were products of Florence's mercantile ethics. The guilds representing these interests, from silk and wool merchants to stonecutters and woodcarvers, commissioned most of the public works of the first decades of the 15th century, subjecting them to rigorous control. Like the princes, they competed with each other for prestige, alongside the wealthy Florentine entrepreneurs who built increasingly elaborate palaces and private chapels.

== Characteristics ==
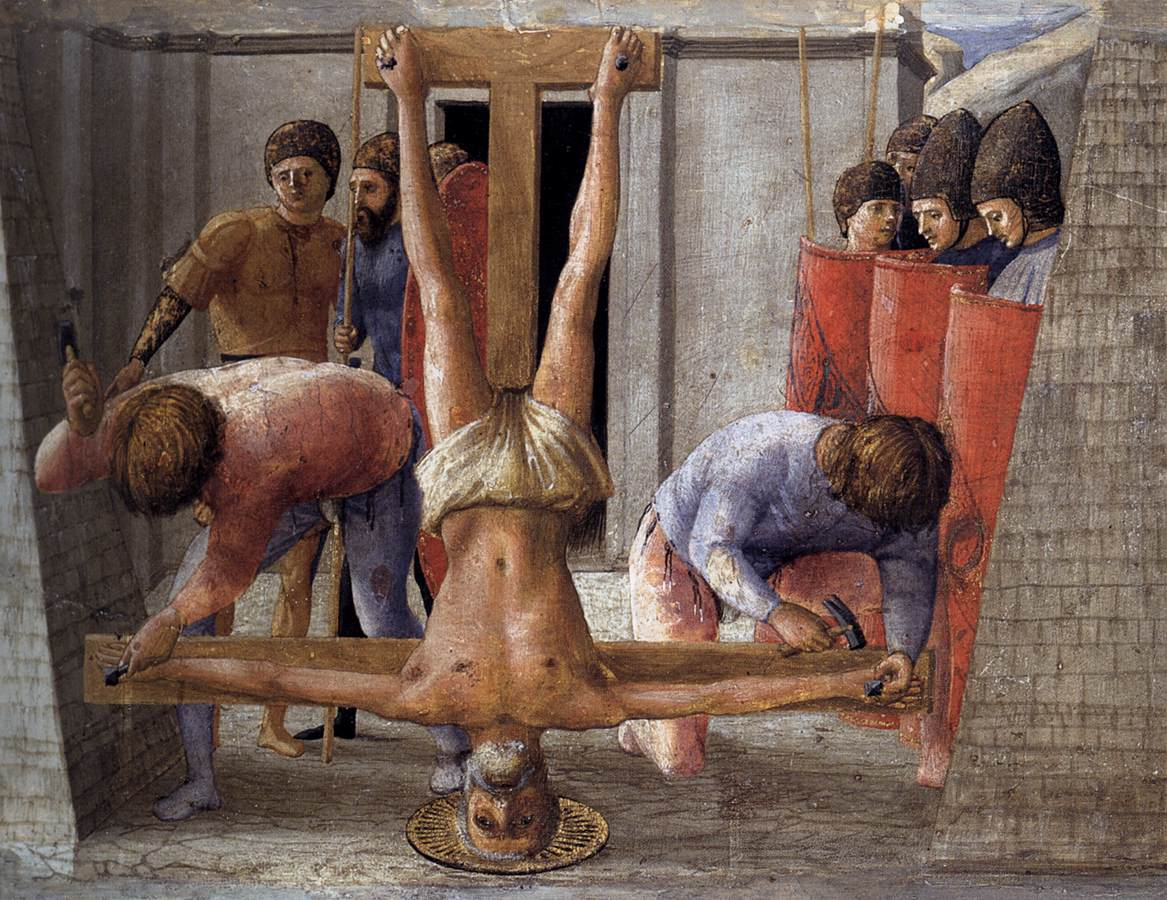
Masaccio, Crucifixion of Saint Peter from the Pisa Altarpiece.

The main characteristics of the new style are found in a formulation of the rules of perspective used to organise space, in the attention paid to the human being as an individual, concerning anatomy and physiognomy as well as the representation of emotions, and in the rejection of decorative elements with a concentration on the essential.

Among these features, the most important is probably the centred monofocal perspective, built using a geometric method perfected at the turn of the century by Filippo Brunelleschi. Its use requires only a basic knowledge of geometry, which probably explains its success. In unison with the mentality of Renaissance man, perspective allows the rational use of space according to criteria established by the artist; the choices that determine the rules are subjective, such as vanishing point, distance from the viewer and height of the horizon.

== Pioneers (1401) ==
At the dawn of the 15th century, while International Gothic was in vogue in Italy and Europe, a debate was taking place in Florence on two antagonistic artistic trends: one was inclined to accept the Gothic style adapted to local tradition, the other was inclined to reappropriate the more rigorous manner of the Ancients, restoring Florentia's original Roman bond.

These two trends can be seen in the construction of the Porta della Mandorla (1391), where, alongside Gothic spirals and ornamentation, the doorcases feature figures solidly modelled in the antique style.

The competition for the north door of Florence's Baptistery, sponsored by the Arte di Calimala in 1401, further highlights these two tendencies. The specifications called for a formalla, a bas-relief depicting the Binding of Isaac. Lorenzo Ghiberti and Filippo Brunelleschi, among others, took part in the competition, whose finalist panels have survived.

Ghiberti's work presents figures modelled in a Hellenistic style, with an abandonment of physical beauty and perfection, without expression or implication, while Brunelleschi's work is inspired by the ancient style of Giovanni Pisano, a pyramid-shaped scene, with attention drawn to the intersection of the perpendicular lines of Abraham's hands, the angel and Isaac's body, the central point of the scene, according to a less elegant but more disruptive expressivity.

The competition was won by Ghiberti, demonstrating that it was not yet the right time for the change proposed by Brunelleschi.

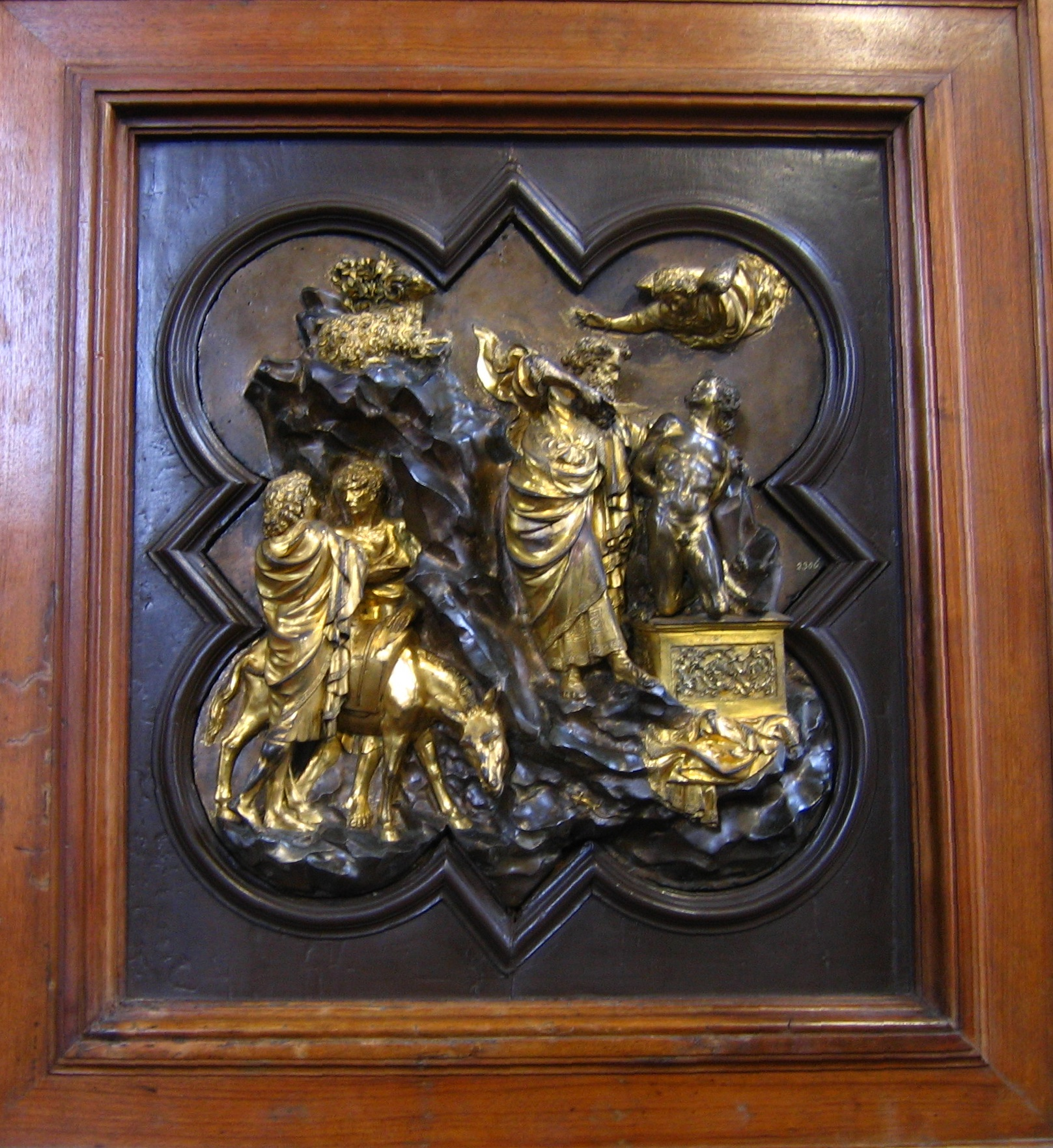
The Sacrifice of Isaac, Ghiberti (1401), Bargello Museum

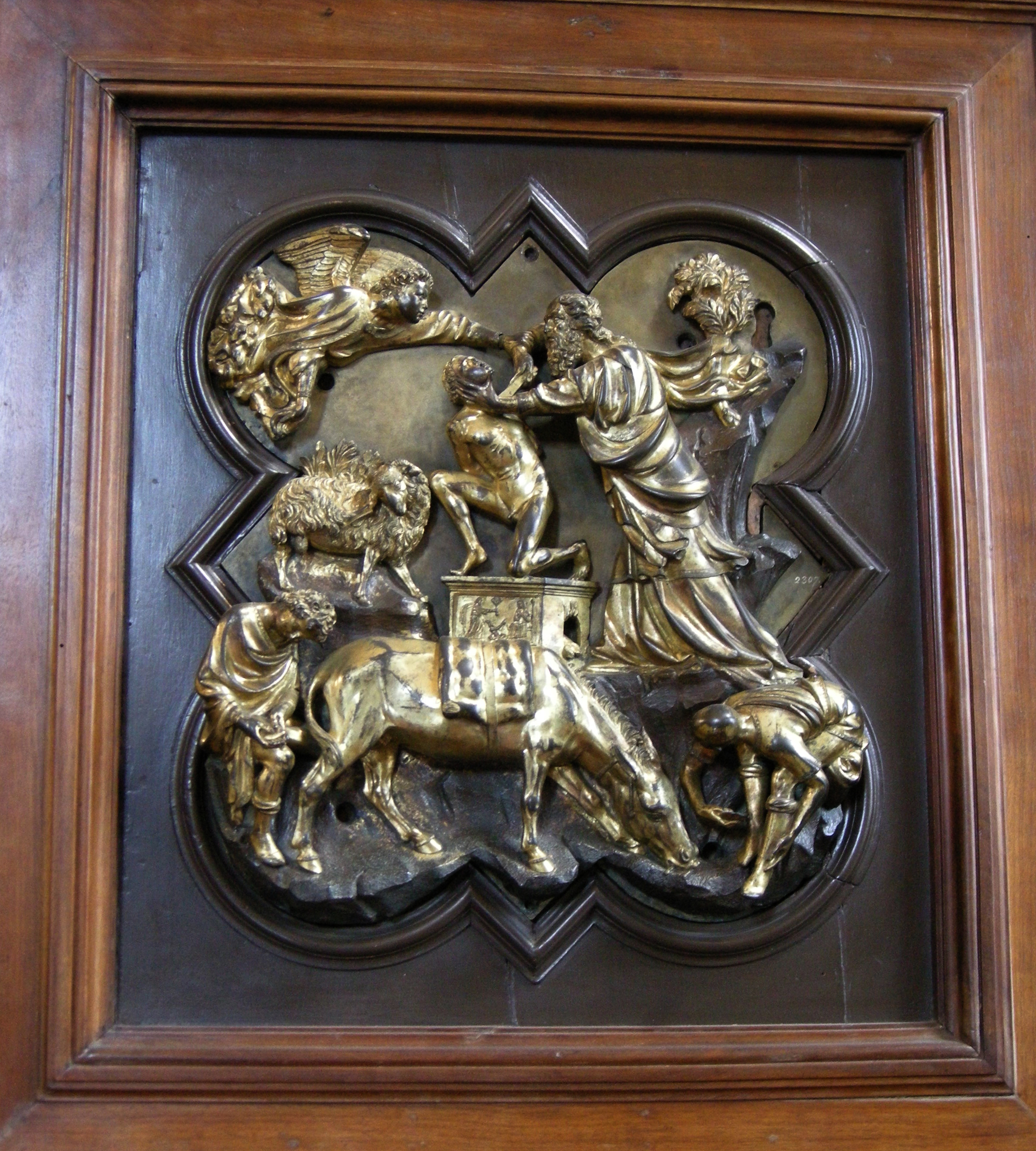
The Sacrifice of Isaac, Brunelleschi (1401), Bargello Museum

== Origin and development (1410–1440) ==
The first phase of the Renaissance, which developed in the 1430s and 1440s, was a period of experimentation, characterised by a technical and practical approach in which innovations and advances were taken up by local artists.

The first art form to develop this new artistic language was sculpture. The local presence of ancient works facilitated this development. As early as 1410–1420, the sculptor Donatello developed an original style inspired by Antiquity. followed by architecture dominated by Filippo Brunelleschi. The first works on the new Ospedale degli Innocenti and the Old Sacristy of San Lorenzo date to 1419. Finally, painting was dominated by Masaccio, active from 1422 to 1428.

The best creations are the result of artistic competitions between artists asked to work "face to face" on identical or similar subjects, such as the crucifixes by Brunelleschi and Donatello, the cantorie in the Duomo by Donatello and Luca della Robbia, and the frescoed stories in the Brancacci Chapel by Masaccio, Masolino and Filippino Lippi.

=== Sculpture ===
==== Two crucifixes ====
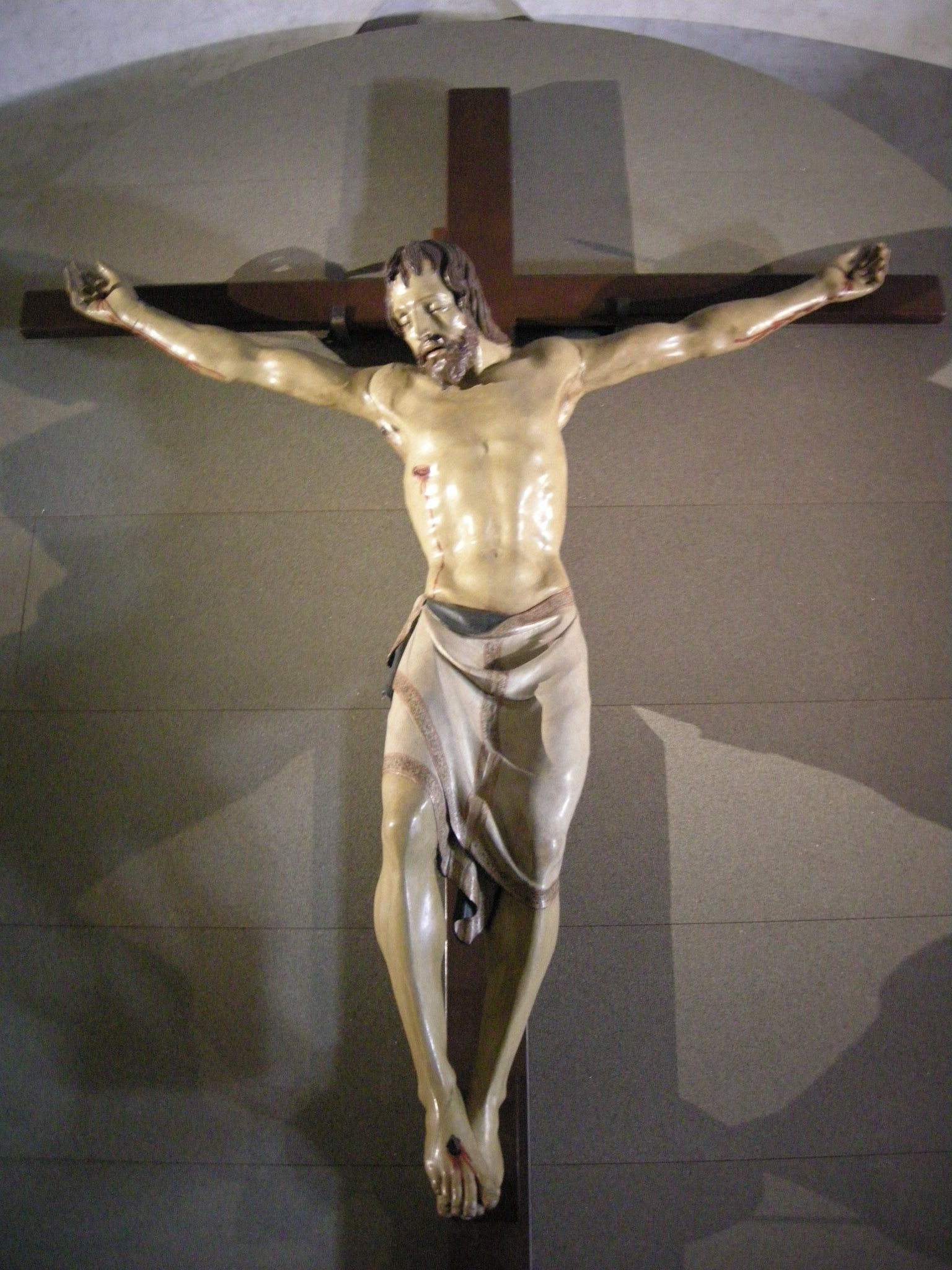
Donatello, Crucifix (c. 1406–08), Santa Croce

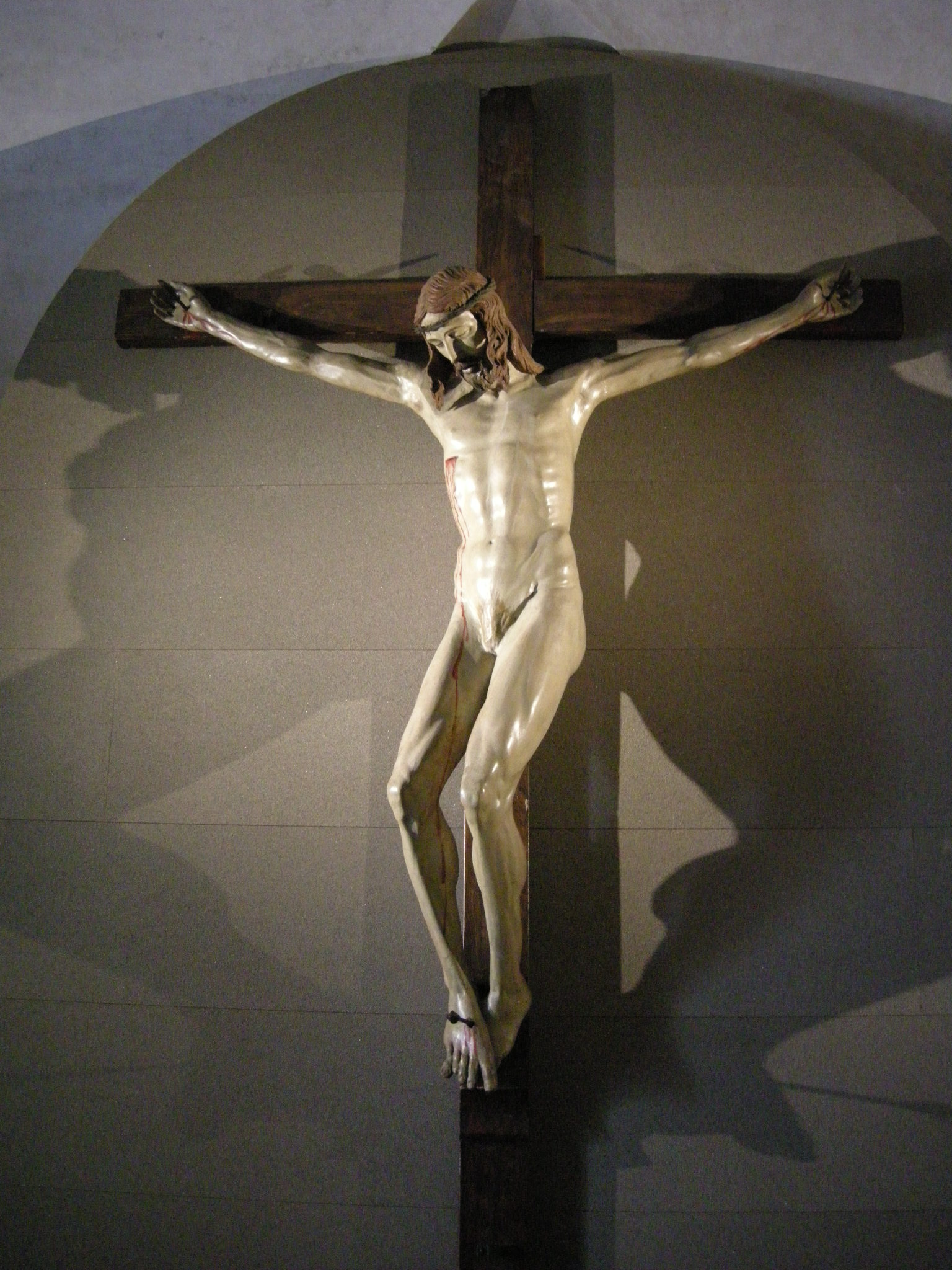
Filippo Brunelleschi, Crucifix (c. 1410–15), Santa Maria Novella

Brunelleschi and Donatello were two artists who quickly assimilated the concepts of the new artistic language. Brunelleschi was about ten years older, and was probably the guide and stimulator for his younger colleague, with whom he travelled to Rome in 1409, where they studied ancient works and sought to discover the techniques that made such creations possible. Despite their similar way of thinking, their different temperaments and sensibilities meant that their artistic works had very different characteristics.

An example of this is the comparison of two wooden crucifixes, at the centre of an anecdote told by Giorgio Vasari, who witnessed Brunelleschi's criticism of Donatello's Santa Croce Crucifix and his response with the Crucifix of Santa Maria Novella, which leaves his colleague shocked. In reality, it seems that the two pieces were not produced at the same time, and the gap would be around ten years, but nonetheless the anecdote remains eloquent.

Donatello's Crucifix focuses on human suffering, emphasising aesthetics: the muscular contractions underline the moment of agony, and the body is heavy and graceless, but exudes vigorous energy.

Brunelleschi's Crucifix, on the other hand, is more idealised and calibrated, its perfect forms echoing the divine perfection of the subject.

The proportions are carefully studied: the span of the open arms is the same as the height of the figure, the bridge of the nose points to the barycentre of the navel, recalling the typology of Giotto's crucifix, but with a slight twist to the left creating various "points of view", generating space around it, thus inviting the viewer to make a semicircular journey around the figure.

According to the art historian Luciano Bellosi, Brunelleschi's Crucifix is "the first work of Renaissance style in the history of art", and a point of reference for later developments by Donatello, Nanni di Banco and Masaccio.

==== Orsanmichele ====
In 1406, the Arti were commissioned to decorate the external niches of the church of Orsanmichele with statues of their patron saints. The project was added to that of the Duomo, which at the time was carried out in a style similar to the work of Lorenzo Ghiberti, blending Gothic and antique elements with natural, flexible movements that left little room for experimentation.

It was in this context that Donatello and the slightly younger Nanni di Banco were formed. The two artists began to collaborate. Between 1411 and 1417, both worked at Orsanmichele, making it possible to compare their main works and their individual characteristics.

Both artists reject Gothic concepts, taking their inspiration from ancient art. They place the figures freely in space, amplifying their plastic force and physiognomic rendering.

Nevertheless, Nanni di Banco reproduced imperial Roman portraits in his Four Crowned Martyrs (1411–1414). Donatello, in his Saint George (1415–1417), created a figure that is "restrained" yet energetic and vivacious, as if it were about to leap from one moment to the next. This effect is achieved by the compact, geometric shapes that make up the statue. The triangle formed by the spread legs in "compass-style", the ovals of the shield and breastplate, the slight lateral deviation of the head in the opposite direction to that of the body, the detail of the neck tendons, the frowning eyebrows and the contrast of the deep eyes.

In the bas-relief Saint George Freeing the Princess, at the foot of the tabernacle, Donatello sculpted one of the earliest examples of stiacciato and one of the earliest representations of central linear perspective.

Unlike Brunelleschi, whose perspective was a means of fixing spatiality a posteriori, Donatello placed the vanishing point behind the figures in order to highlight the centre of the action, creating a contrasting effect, as if the space were revealed behind the figures.

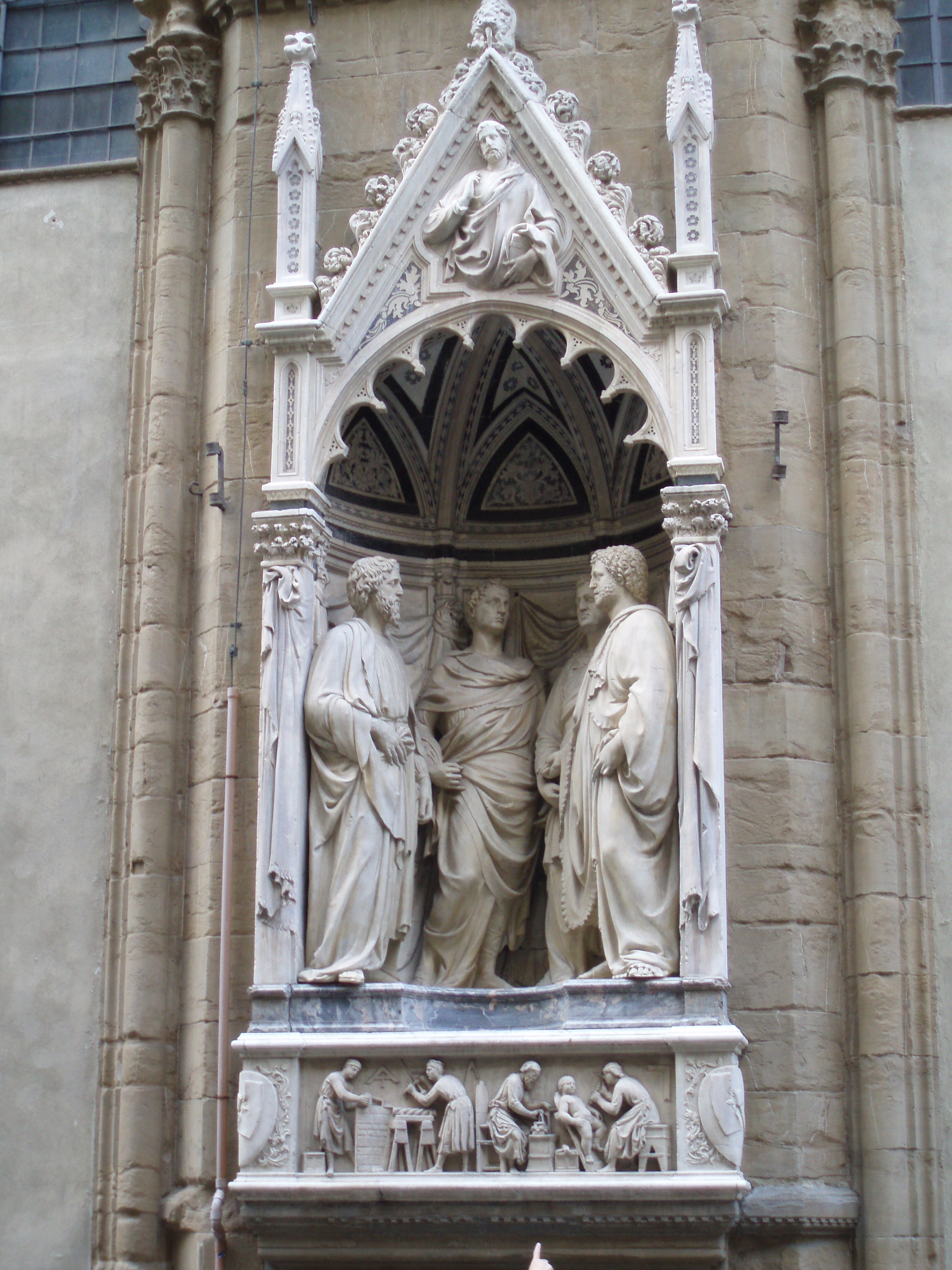
Nanni di Banco, Four Crowned Martyrs (1411–1414)

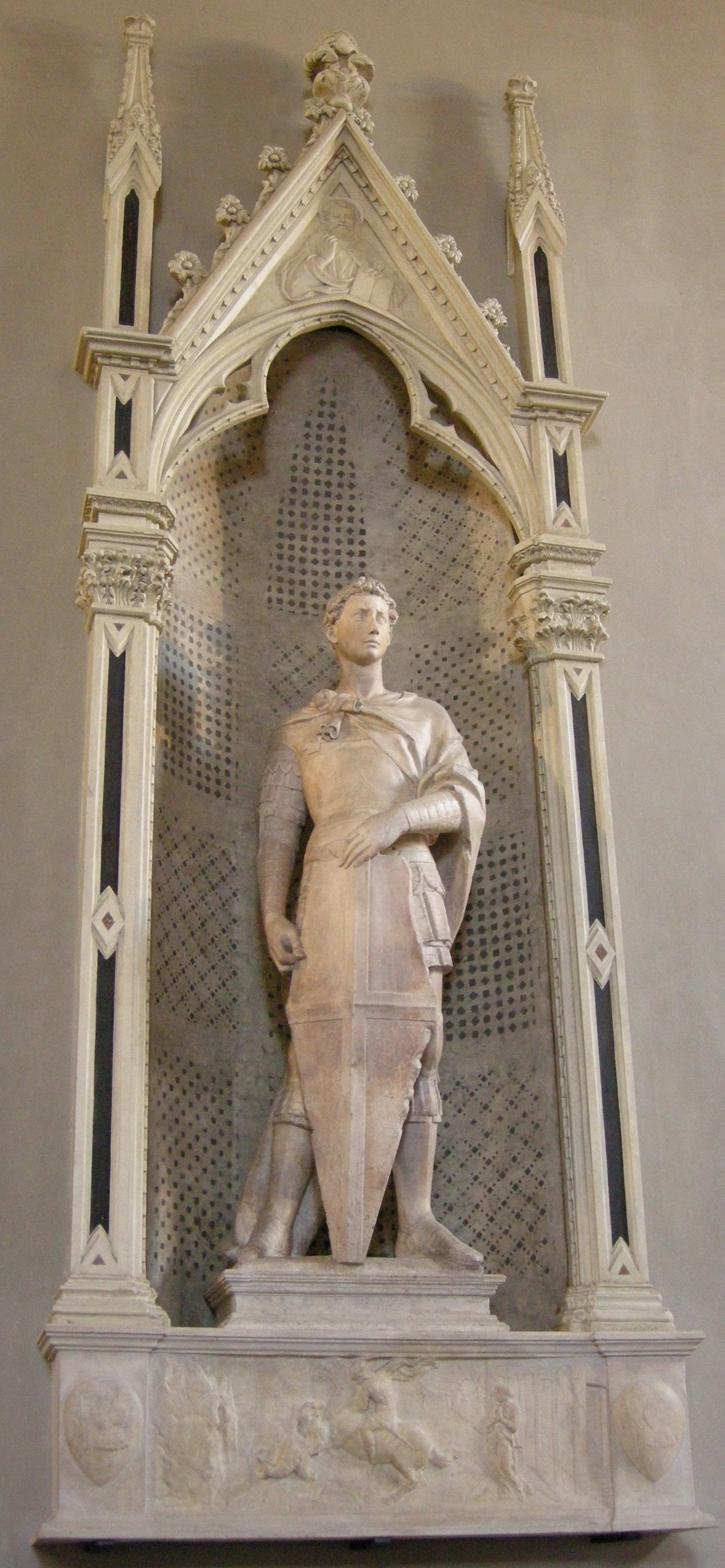
Donatello, Saint George (1415–1417)

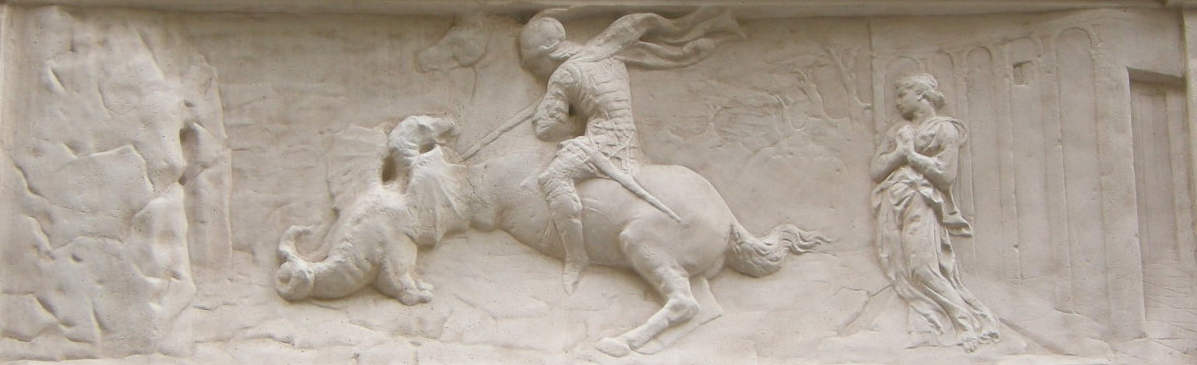
Donatello, Saint George Freeing the Princess (1416–1417)

==== Cantorie of the Duomo ====
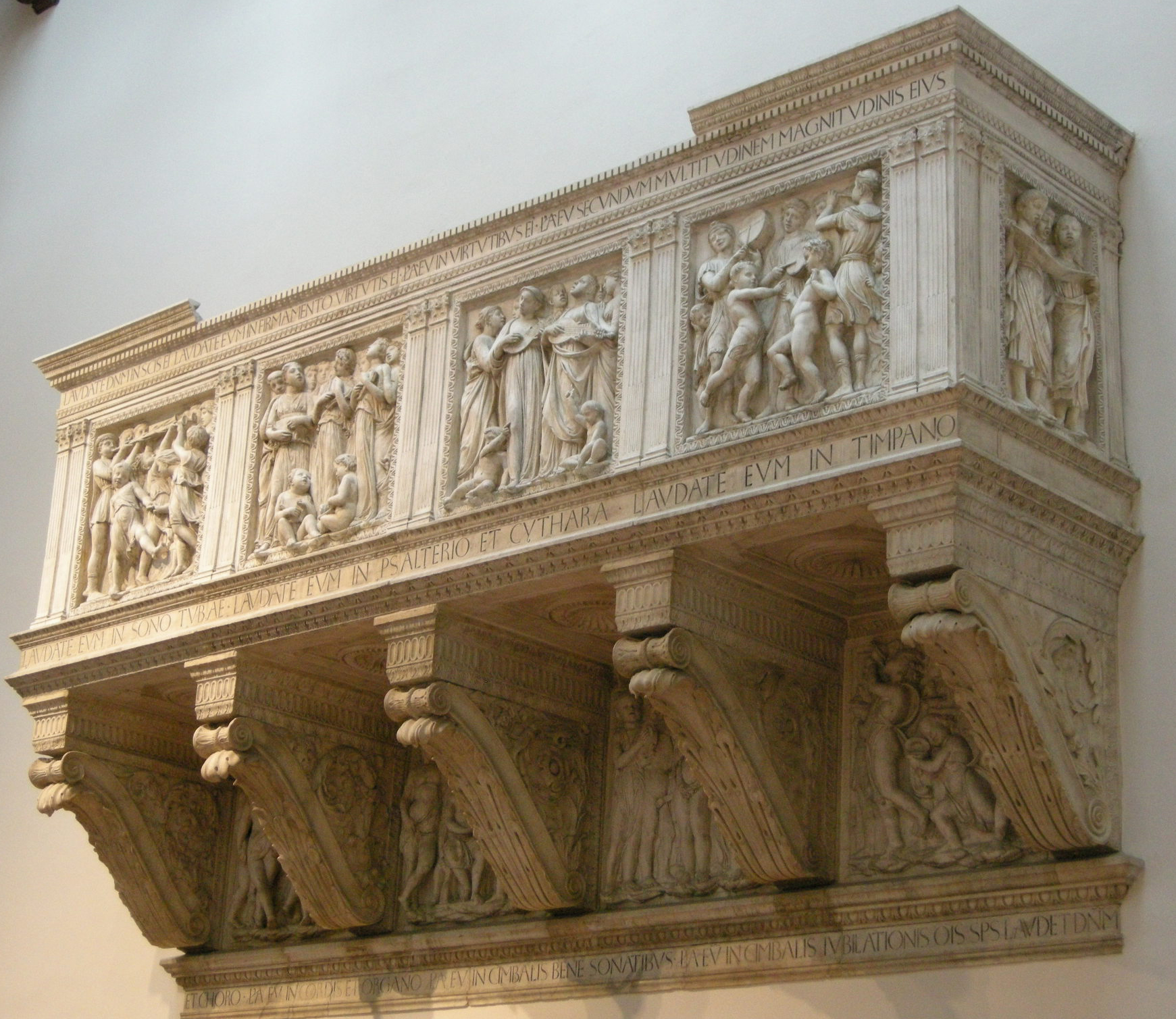
Luca della Robbia, Cantoria (1431–1438), Museo dell'Opera del Duomo, Florence

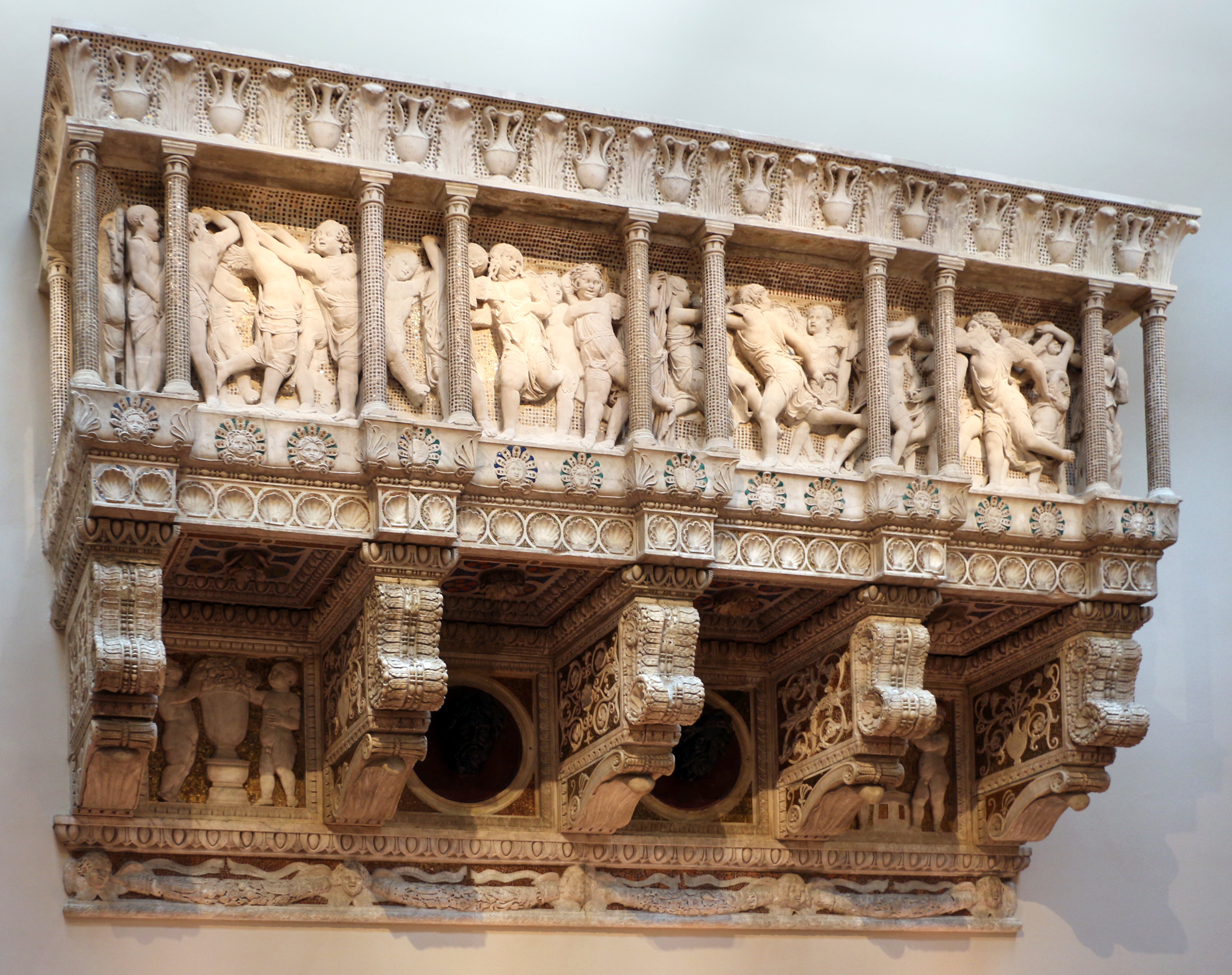
Donatello, Cantoria (1433–1438), Museo dell'Opera del Duomo, Florence

In the 1430s, the creation of two cantorie (singing galleries) for the Duomo marked the passing of the baton between the two artistic styles. In 1431, a cantoria was commissioned from Luca della Robbia, and in 1433 it was joined by a second of the same dimensions by Donatello.

Luca della Robbia, who was in his early thirties at the time, sculpted a classical six-panel cantoria, with four more panels between the corbels. The bas-reliefs depict Psalm 150, the text of which is inscribed in capital letters on the bands above, below and beneath the corbels. The sculpted groups of young people singing, dancing and playing have the classic ordered beauty that, animated by their natural position, expresses feelings in a calm and serene manner.

Donatello, who had just returned from a second trip to Rome (1430–1432), drew inspiration from early Christian and Roman works, creating a continuous frieze of small columns where putti dance frenetically against a mosaic-decorated background. The construction with small columns in the foreground creates a kind of scene delimited by the frieze, which runs along diagonal lines that contrast with the straight, perpendicular lines of the cantoria's architecture. The movement is accentuated by the colours of the gold-ground tesserae that inlay the background and all the architectural elements.

The result is an exaltation of movement and expression that became the hallmark of Donatello's style, which the artist brought to Padua in 1443.

=== Architecture ===
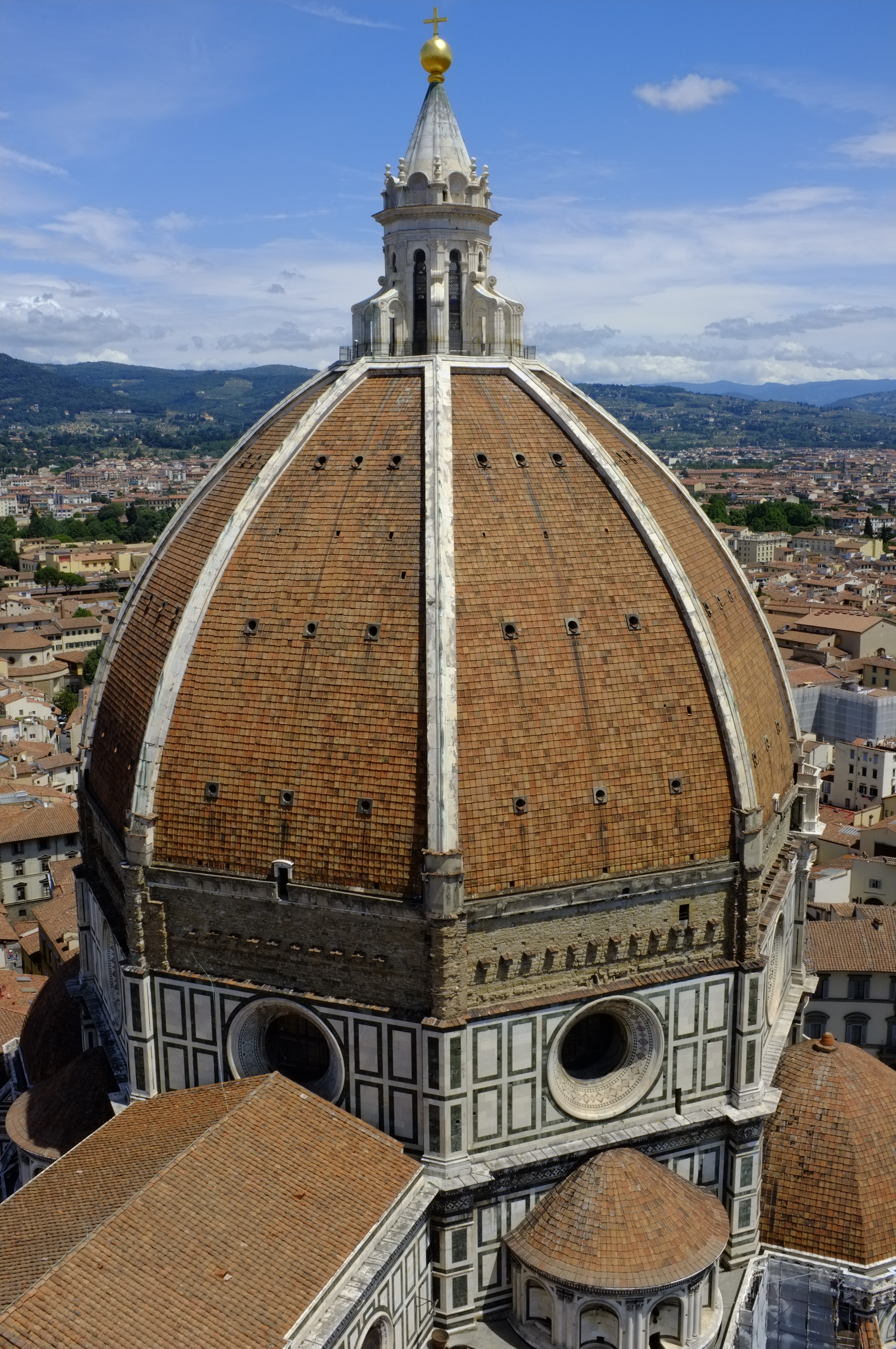
View of the dome of Florence Cathedral from Giotto's Campanile.

Filippo Brunelleschi was a leading figure of the early Florentine Renaissance. Initially active as a sculptor, he turned to architecture in the first decade of the 15th century, taking advantage of his travels to Rome to refine his observations on the architecture of ancient monuments, in order to establish practical rules for construction. He was initially commissioned by the Florentine Republic to design military works such as the fortifications of Staggia, and Vicopisano, before turning his attention to the problem of the dome of Santa Maria del Fiore.

In his architectural work, he addresses technical-structural issues by strictly associating them with the forms' stylistic characteristics. Grey pietra serena, for example, is used for the architectural frames, contrasting with the pale rendering of the walls.

He uses classical elements inspired by architectural classical orders, concentrating only on a few modules combined in various ways to avoid repetition, in contrast to the thousand facets of Gothic architecture. The clarity of his architecture is a function of a precise harmonic union of the various parts of the building, which does not come from geometric forms, but emerges from the simple and intuitive repetition of the basic measure, often the Florentine fathom, whose multiples and submultiples generate all the useful dimensions. The Ospedale degli Innocenti (1419–1428), for example, features a portico with semicircular arches supported by columns that form nine bays with a square plan. The module is based on the length of the column, which determines both span and depth. The space thus appears clear and measurable to the naked eye, with a harmonious rhythm highlighted by a few decorative elements.

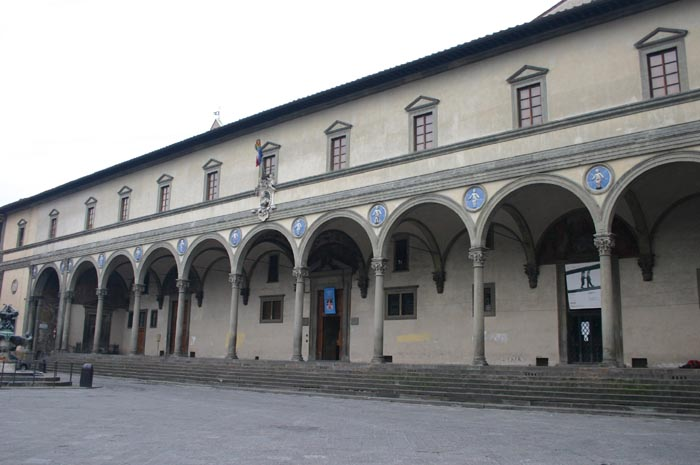
Ospedale degli Innocenti

In 1421, Brunelleschi created the chapel known as the Old Sacristy for the Basilica of San Lorenzo. This was the first centrally planned Renaissance building: a cube surmounted by a hemispherical dome with a figurative sky, the vaults of which rest on pendentives.

In 1425, he began rebuilding the Basilica of San Lorenzo, adopting a basilica plan with three naves.

Nevertheless, his most significant work is the cupola of Florence's Duomo, a project initiated by Giotto's successors and which he took over again: a testament to his architectural savoir-faire, through its dimensions, the techniques employed and the quality of the work carried out. It brings into play his conception of an open, "rationally decomposed" space.

=== Painting ===
==== Masaccio ====
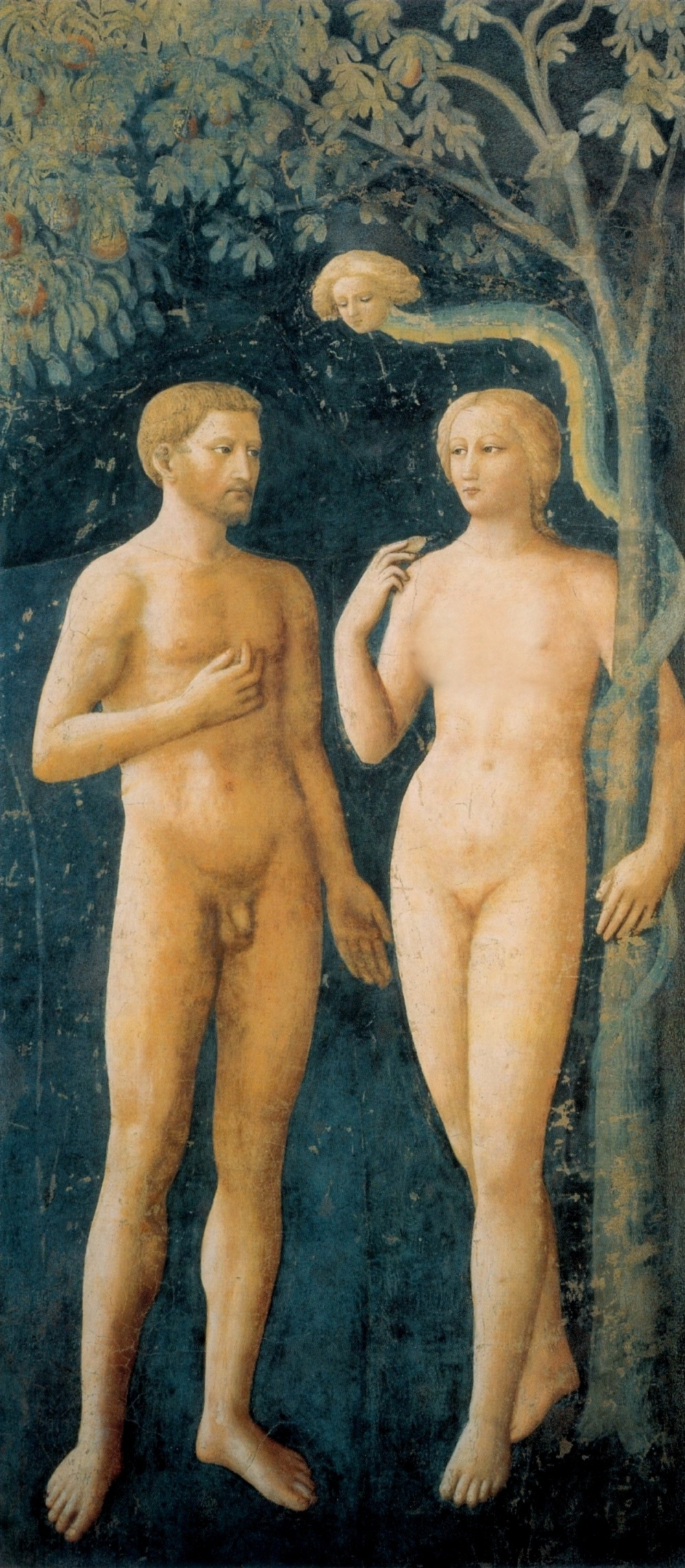
Masolino, Original Sin, Brancacci Chapel, Santa Maria del Carmine

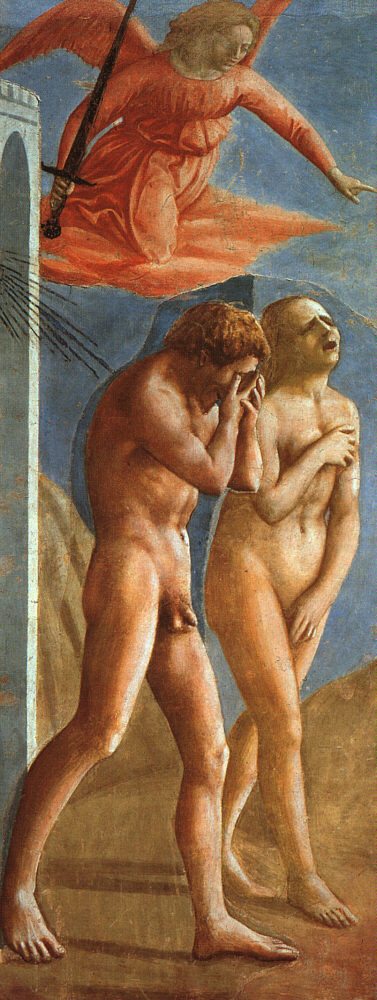
Masaccio, Expulsion from the Garden of Eden, Brancacci Chapel

In painting, Masaccio, whose activity was concentrated on a short period from 1422 to 1428, was an important figure in the Florentine Renaissance. In 1417, he was in Florence, where he met Brunelleschi and Donatello. On the basis of their contributions concerning the occupation of space and the strength of plastic expression, he revised Giotto's work, as evidenced in his first known work, the San Giovenale Triptych (1422). He set up a studio in collaboration with Masolino da Panicale, and the two artists influenced each other, as shown by their first studio work, the Virgin and Child with Saint Anne in the Uffizi.

Masolino's style moved away from the late Gothic of his earlier works, such as his Madonna of Humility, while Masaccio was already developing a mode of painting that created solid figures with shadow effects reminiscent of sculptures coherently placed in the pictorial space.

This strength in the construction of the figures and their position in space, which emphasises their expressions and postures, was further developed in the Pisa Altarpiece, begun in 1426 and now dispersed, and in the frescoes for the Brancacci Chapel, begun in 1424 in collaboration with Masolino, continued by Massaccio alone from 1426 to 1427, and completed by Filippino Lippi in 1481 and 1482. The work is considered crucial to the renewal of painting, and was studied by generations of painters, including Michelangelo.

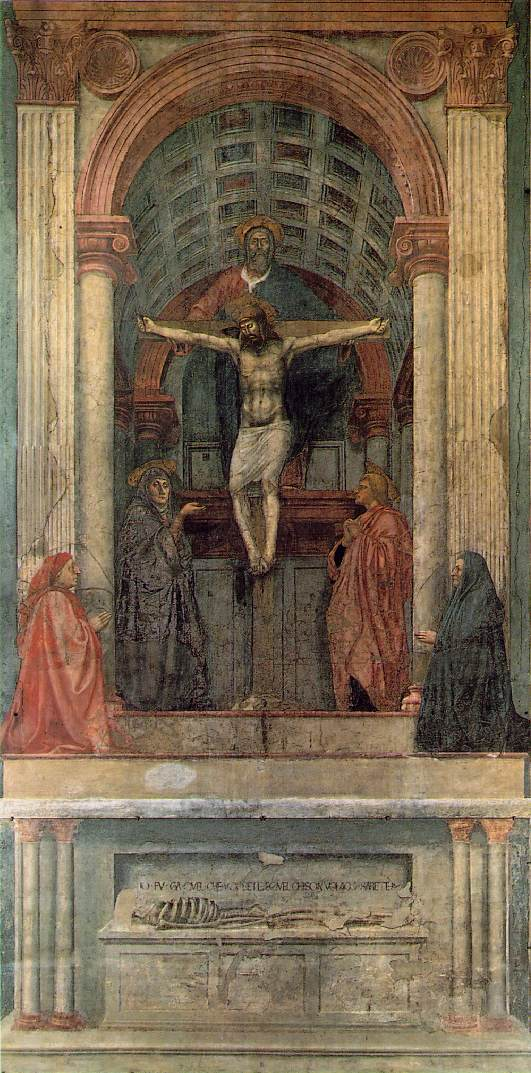
Masaccio, Holy Trinity (1425), Santa Maria Novella

Another major work is the Holy Trinity fresco in the church of Santa Maria Novella, with its spectacular coffered vaulted ceiling behind Christ on the Cross. Vasari, in the second edition of his Lives (1568), describes this trompe-l'œil in detail: "It is a barrel vault, drawn in perspective, and divided into coffers decorated with rosettes that diminish, so that it looks as if the vault is sinking into the wall."

Considered a milestone in the history of art, Masaccio's Trinity represents the translation into painting of the laws of perspective revealed by Brunelleschi. Some critics believe that Brunelleschi himself drew the perspective lines; others maintain that Masaccio interpreted Brunelleschi's innovations.

Massaccio is considered the greatest painter of the early Renaissance and is traditionally presented as the first modern painter. He introduced the notion of optical truth, perspective and volume into Western art. Remarkable for his ability to depict the expressions and postures of his figures, he was one of the first to put into practice Brunelleschi's research into perspective.

==== Masaccio's followers ====
Masaccio's first disciples were some of his pupils and the artists who studied the master's innovations in the Brancacci Chapel. Among these, the most prominent were Fra Filippo Lippi and Fra Angelico.

===== Fra Angelico =====
Fra Angelico, a pupil of Lorenzo Monaco, had already moved away from the International Gothic style. In his early works as an illuminator, he created elongated geometric figures with simple, heavily pleated clothes and luminous colours in a well-defined space. These elements can also be found in his early works on panel, such as the San Pietro Martire Triptych (1427–1428). He incorporated the stylistic innovations introduced by Masaccio, Masolino and Paolo Uccello (interlocking interiors thanks to artificial perspective), initiating the artistic movement known as the "painters of light" by playing with light and shadow to give depth to his paintings or modelling to his figures, thus abandoning the flat tints of Gothic painting (the only relief previously being given by small white touches on borders or edgings, simulating light).

===== Fra Filippo Lippi =====
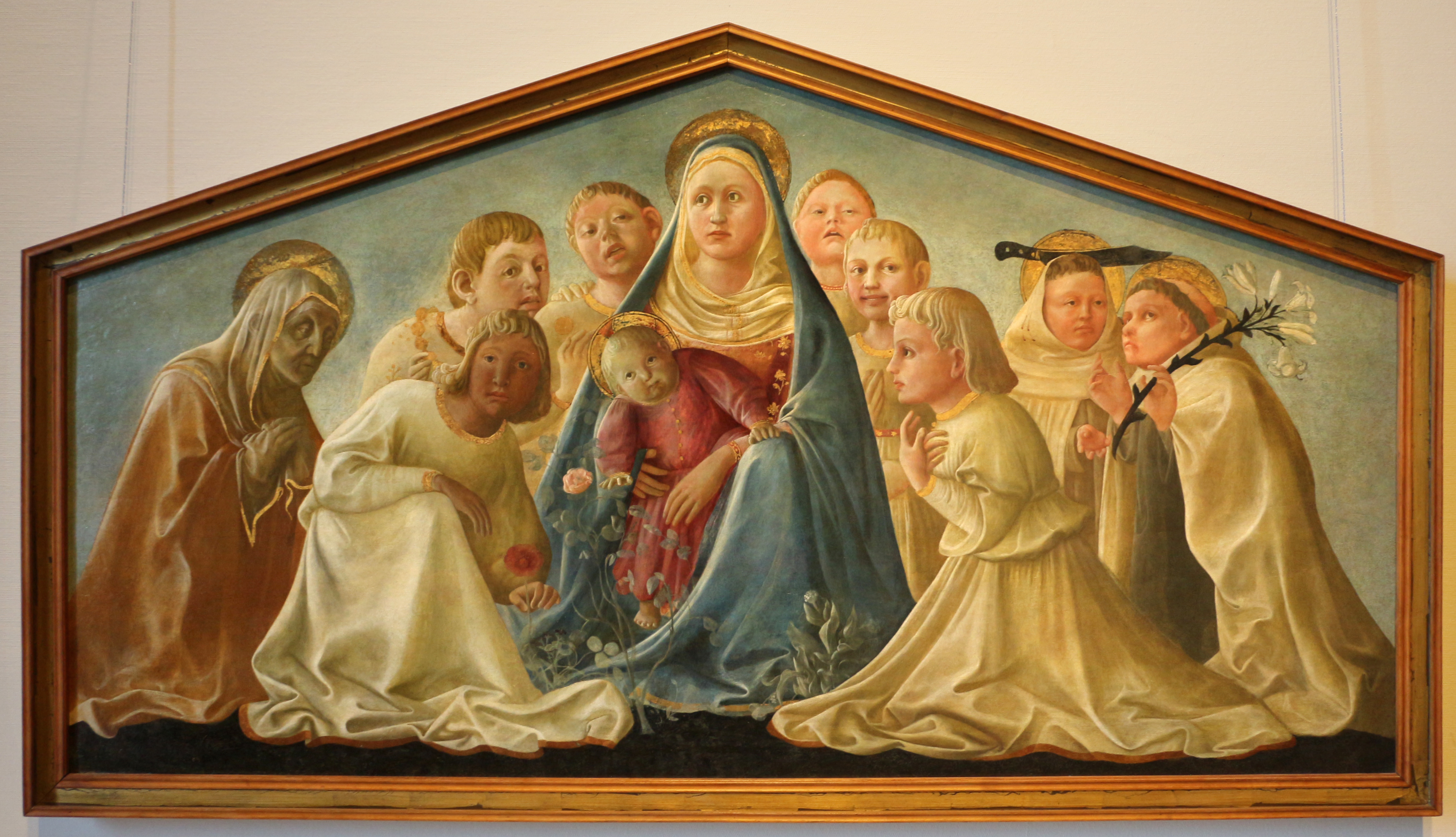
Filippo Lippi, Trivulzio Madonna (1430–1432)

Fra Filippo Lippi was initially influenced by Lorenzo Monaco and above all by Masaccio, of whom he was a pupil and whom he had seen working at the convent of Santa Maria del Carmine. Later, Filippo Lippi met Fra Angelico, who in turn influenced his art.

In his early works, such as the Trivulzio Madonna, the figures are dilated with strong contrasts and the use of colour. In the group of wingless angels and in the saints depicted as children, lively expressions appear, reminiscent of the cantorie of Donatello and Luca della Robbia.

Fra Filippo Lippi is renowned for his numerous depictions of the Virgin Mary. (Note: In particular, he produced works in the purest tondo tradition, such as the 1453 Madonna and Child and the Nativity of Mary. These two works are part of a theme of scenes linked to the life of the Virgin, initiated by Luca della Robbia and Masaccio.) These are famous for the elegance of their silhouettes and the delicacy of their facial features.

=== Home of innovations ===
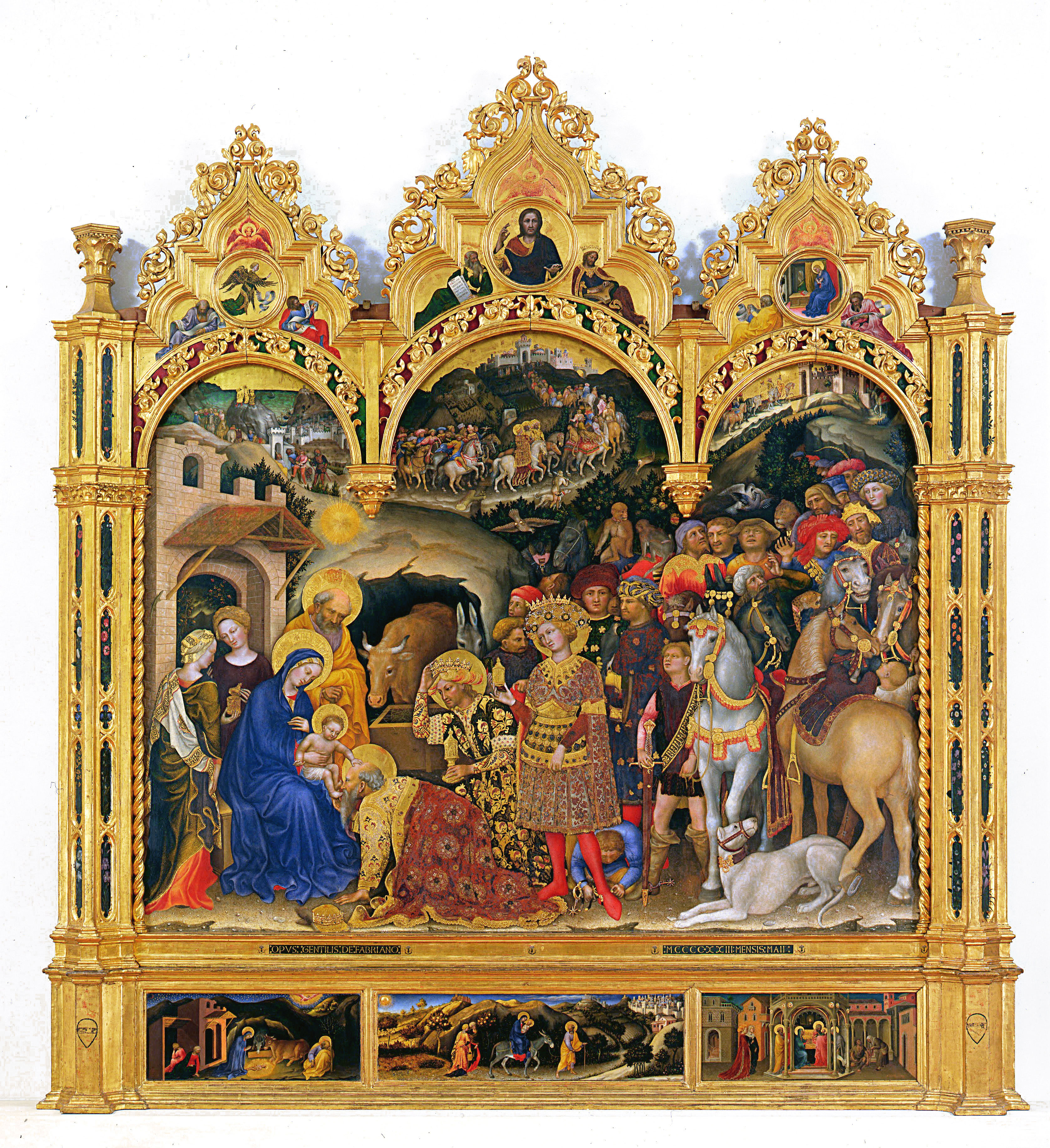
Gentile da Fabriano, Adoration of the Magi (1423)

The innovators of Florentine art were held in high esteem and influenced artistic production. Clients, on the other hand, favoured less radical changes. The best example is that of the wealthy humanist merchant Palla Strozzi, who commissioned Gentile da Fabriano to paint an altarpiece for the Strozzi Chapel in Santa Trinita. Gentile completed the Adoration of the Magi in 1425, still very much in the International Gothic style. The work comprises several scenes placed side by side, where the eye is lost in a myriad of small details and anecdotal scenes, organised in a manner faithful to the Byzantine literary model of ekphrasis, i.e., the description and interpretation of works of art accessible in Florence since 1415.

"Storytelling" artists such as Lorenzo Monaco, or refined personalities whose style was halfway between Gothic fashion and "old-fashioned" novelty, such as Lorenzo Ghiberti, remained popular.

The framework that emerged was based on the detachment of radical, innovative artistic positions from those of the humanist world, which in the early decades sidelined the group of innovators, who remained misunderstood. The "old-fashioned" model favoured by humanists offered eclectic, sometimes opposing points of view. Artists could draw inspiration from this heritage, choosing what best suited the taste and mentality of the moment.

=== Alberti's theorisation ===
From 1435 onwards, innovative fervour gave way to the theorisation of experimentation. The key player in this process was Leon Battista Alberti, who settled in Florence in 1434, just as the revolution in figurative art was coming to an end. Alberti sought to give a scientific foundation to the work of art. He began to evaluate the results obtained, attenuating the differences between artists in favour of an overall vision which had the "renaissance" as its common denominator. In his treatise De pictura, he included Brunelleschi, Donatello, Ghiberti, Luca della Robbia and Masaccio in the dedication.

Alberti sought out the objective foundations and philosophical path that allowed the Renaissance to blossom, confronting technical and aesthetic themes. He dedicated himself to the three "major arts": De pictura in 1436, De re aedificatoria in 1454 and De statua in 1462. His writings served as the basis for the training of subsequent generations, facilitating the dissemination of Renaissance precepts and the transformation of the artist from "medieval craftsman" to "modern intellectual".

=== Intermediary artists ===
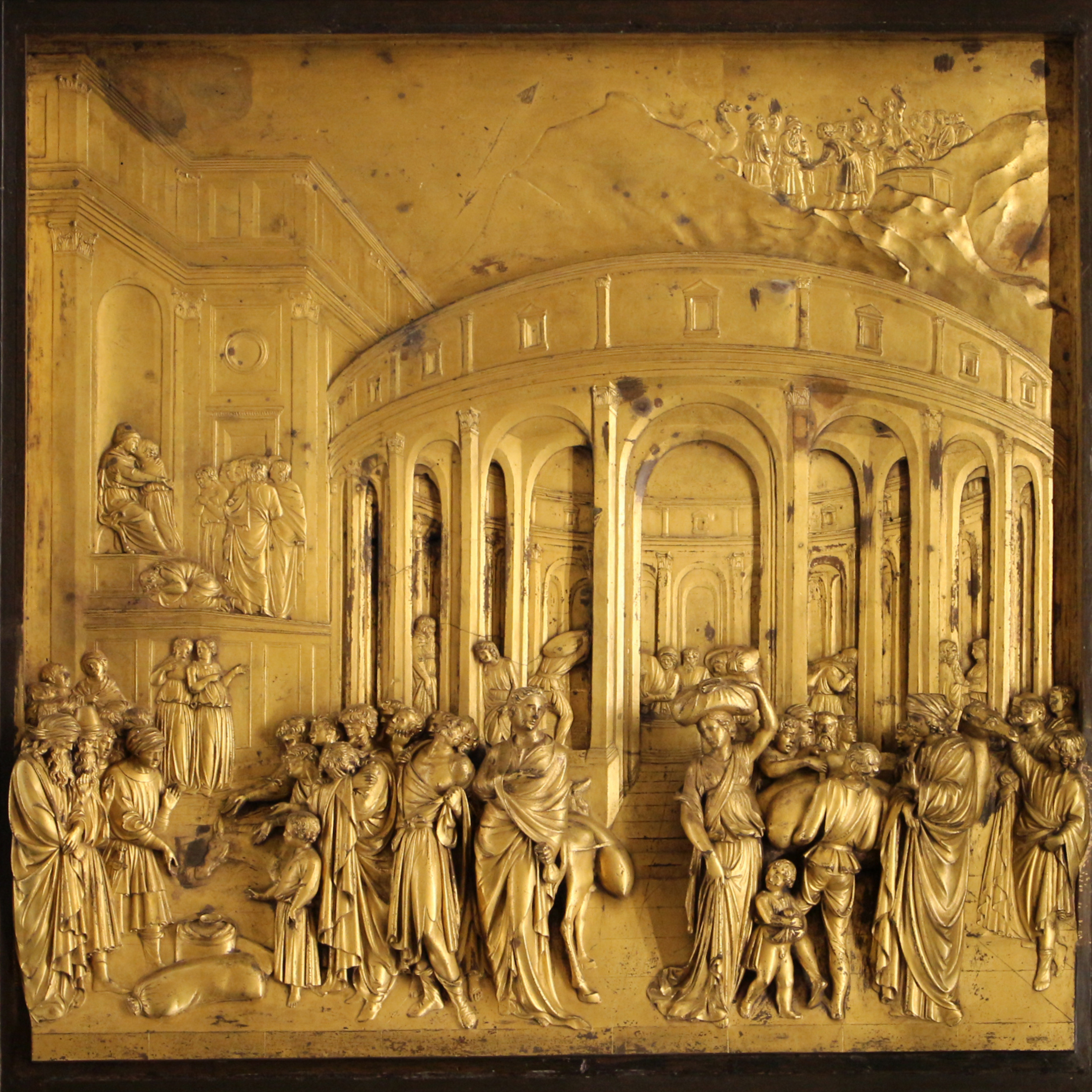
Lorenzo Ghiberti, The Story of Joseph, panel from the Gates of Paradise.

The next phase took place around 1450, with a more intellectual codification of the previous innovations. During these years, the political situation on the Italian peninsula stabilised with the Treaty of Lodi (1454), which divided the territory into five major states. In the towns, the political class made the decisions, bringing dominant figures to power. Princely families, at the head of city-states, competed to produce the most beautiful expressions of their power. The bourgeoisie, less active, invested in agriculture and behaved like the old aristocracy, far from the ideals of sobriety, stubbornly showing off their wealth. The figurative language of these years is cultivated, ornate and flexible.

Once an anonymous craftsman, the artist became an important figure in society. The great creators were humanists, familiar with ancient culture and often with mathematics. Curious minds, they asserted their identity in their work. Thus, unlike the works of the Middle Ages, their creations are now often signed and dated.

==== Lorenzo Ghiberti ====
Lorenzo Ghiberti, Masolino and Michelozzo continued the modernist tradition, updating it in line with the new precepts of humanist culture and perspective. Following the construction of the north door of Florence's Baptistery, which is similar in design to the 14th-century Gothic south door by Andrea Pisano, Ghiberti was commissioned in 1425 to design a new east door, completed in 1452, which Michelangelo called the "Gates of Paradise". This work is emblematic of Ghiberti's "mediating" position. It shows his freedom of composition, using perspective and an ever less accentuated relief to arrange a large number of figures on several planes.

The art historian Henri Focillon describes the door as follows:

The relationship of relief according to the feigned distance of the planes, the calculated passage from the ronde-bosse to the bas-relief and finally to the almost flat modelling of the medal, the rigorous flow of the architecture, the suggestion in bronze of an aerial landscape struck the popular imagination like a miraculous revelation; the gates of the baptistery were henceforth the gates of Paradise.

— Henri Focillon, Art d'occident, t. 2, Le Moyen Âge gothique, Paris, 1965, Librairie Armand Collin, p. 370

==== Masolino ====
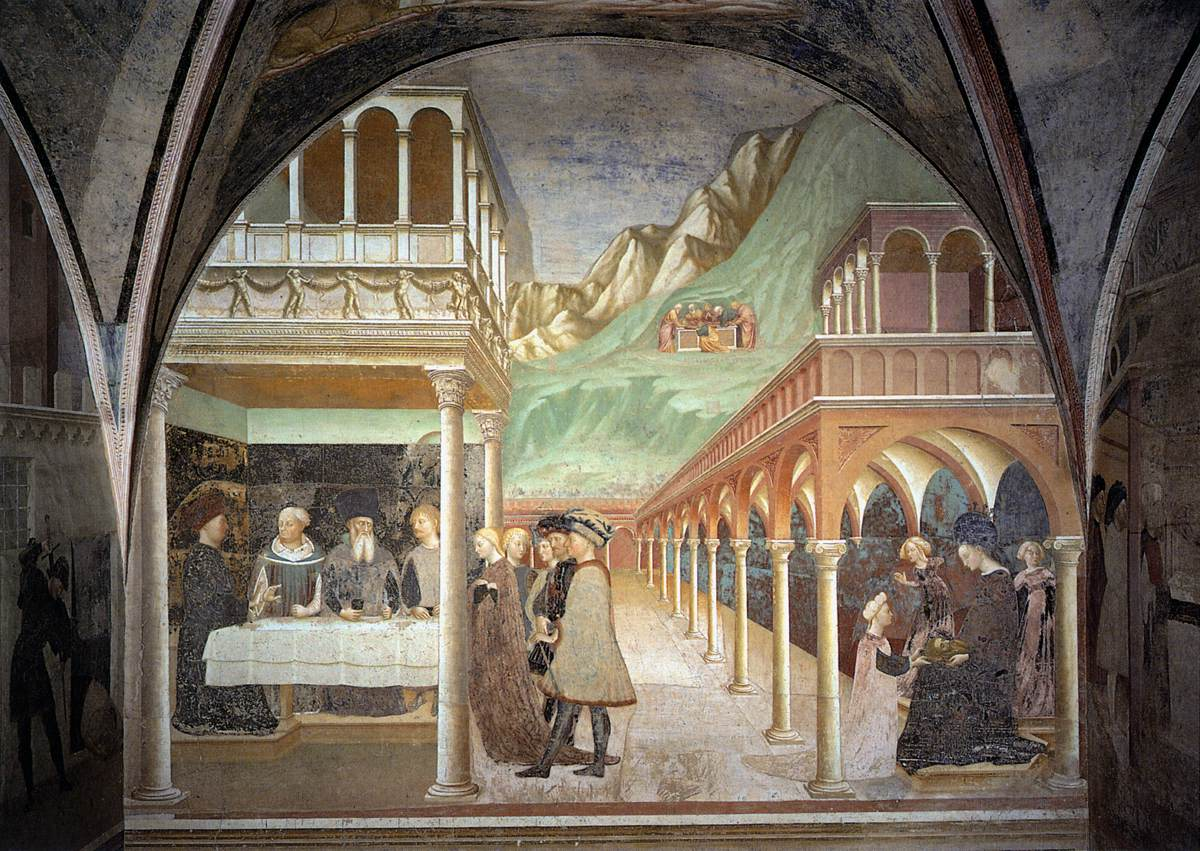
Masolino, The Feast of Herod, Castiglione Olona Baptistery

Masolino da Panicale navigated between international Gothic and Renaissance styles. In his works created after the end of his collaboration with Masaccio, he developed a style that was easy to assimilate in places where Gothic culture was still predominant, such as in Siena, where Vecchietta was his pupil and collaborator, or in northern Italy with the frescoes at Castiglione Olona.

This cycle of frescoes is one of the greatest testimonies to the transition from Gothic to Renaissance style.

==== Michelozzo ====
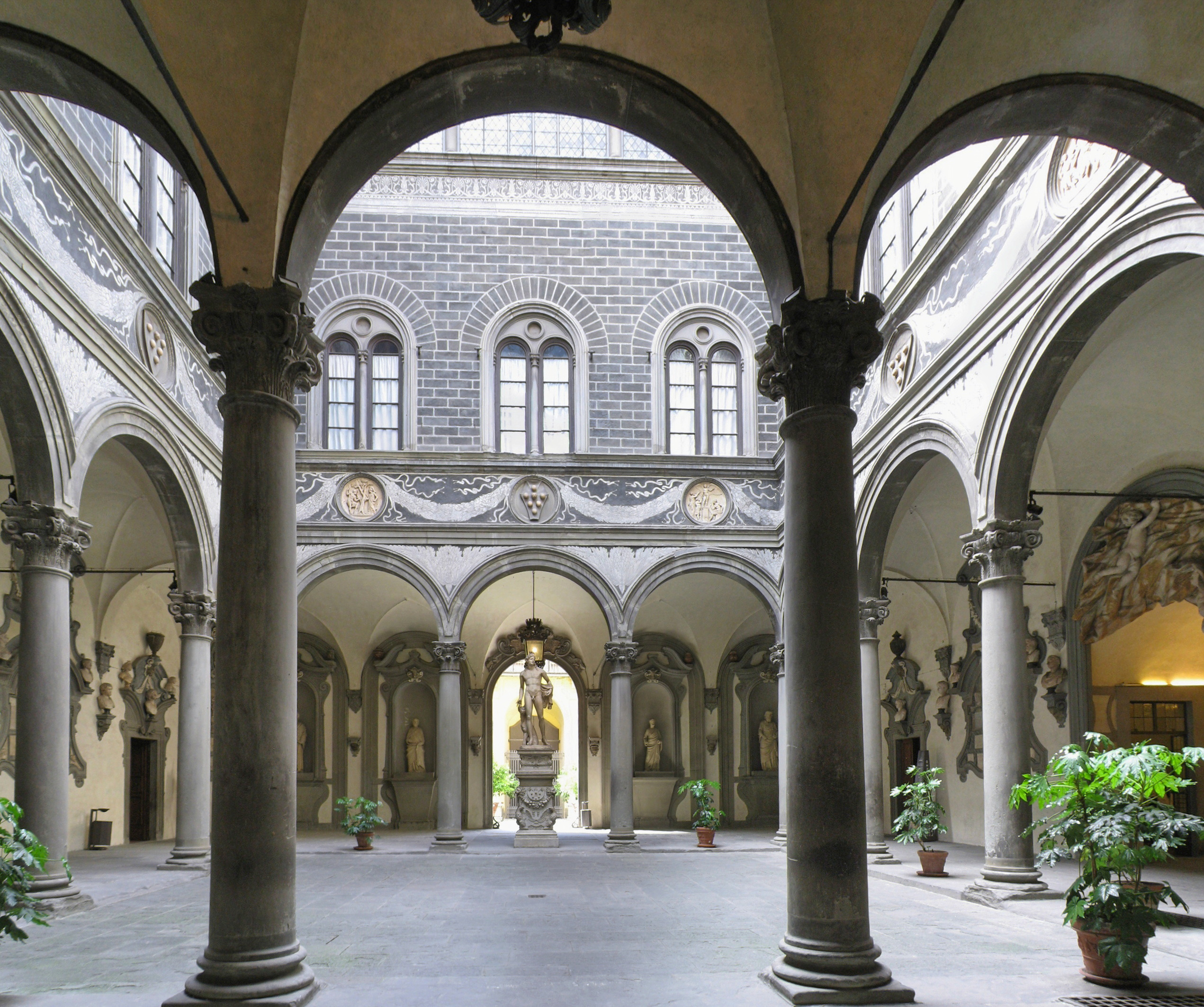
Michelozzo, courtyard of the Palazzo Medici Riccardi

Michelozzo was a sculptor and architect, a great connoisseur of Ghiberti, Donatello and Brunelleschi, with whom he collaborated. A connoisseur of the Gothic tradition, he used the new concepts of the Renaissance to refine and enrich the old tradition. Cosimo de' Medici commissioned his most important works, including the construction of his own palace and the restructuring of the old Dominican convent and library of San Marco.

The Palazzo Medici Riccardi, constructed in 1444, was the archetypal Florentine palazzo, in which Michelozzo closely blended the sober Florentine Gothic style with the new classical trends inspired by Antiquity. Michelozzo thus played an active role in the spread of the new style.

==== Paolo Uccello ====
Giorgio Vasari, in his Lives, states that "Uccello's sole aim was to explore things of difficult and impossible perspective". In so doing, he underlines Paolo Uccello's distinctive trait: his almost obsessive interest in linear perspective. This characteristic, combined with his adherence to the International Gothic style, makes him a figure straddling both figurative worlds. Following a personal artistic path, he uses perspective to situate his figures in a three-dimensional space, while his contemporaries use depth to describe the succession of events in the episode depicted. The intricate construction of his works does not help logical compositional order, but creates fantastical, visionary settings in undefined spaces.

The three panels of The Battle of San Romano

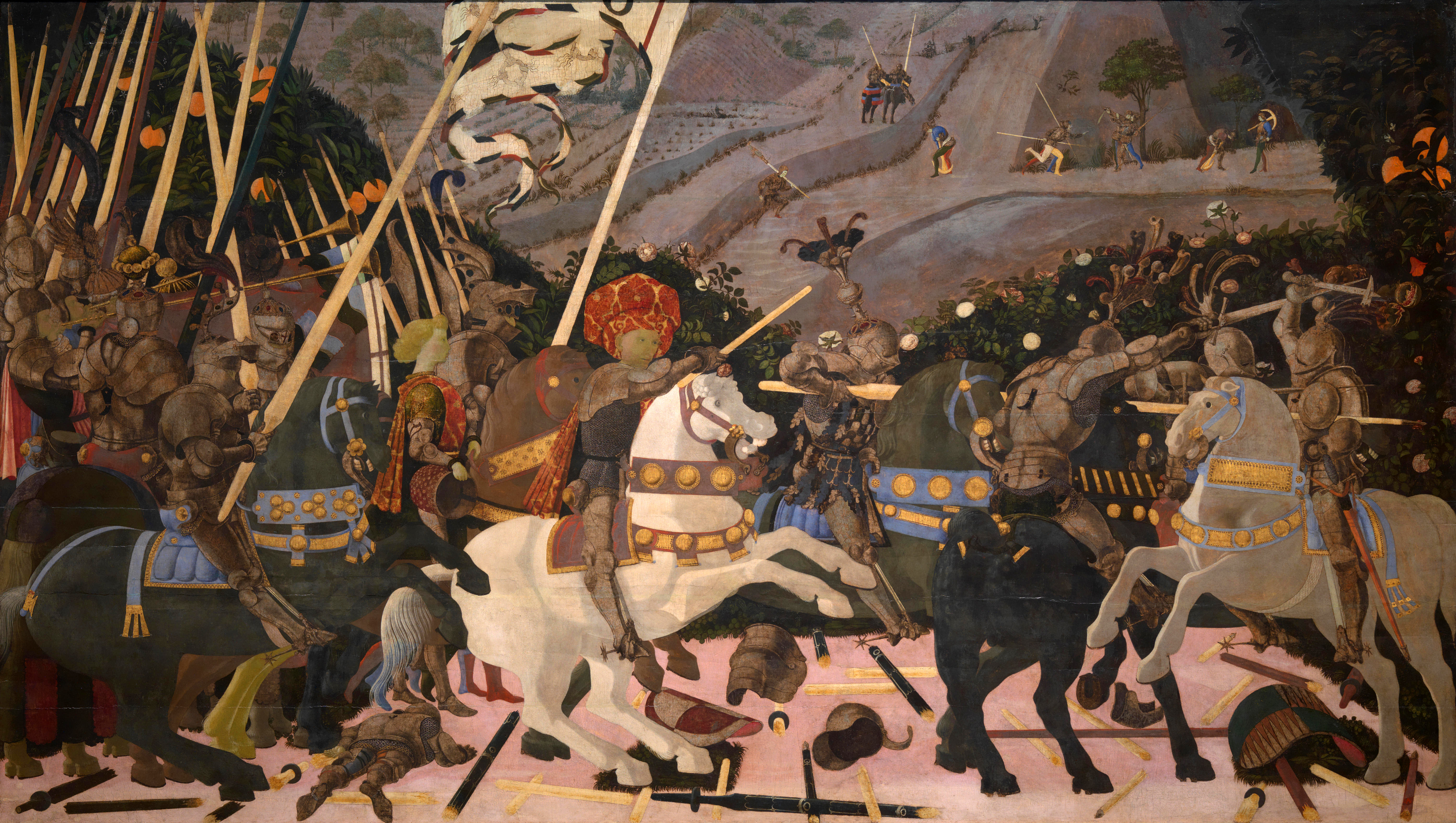
Paolo Uccello, Niccolò Mauruzi da Tolentino at the Battle of San Romano (probably c. 1438–1440)

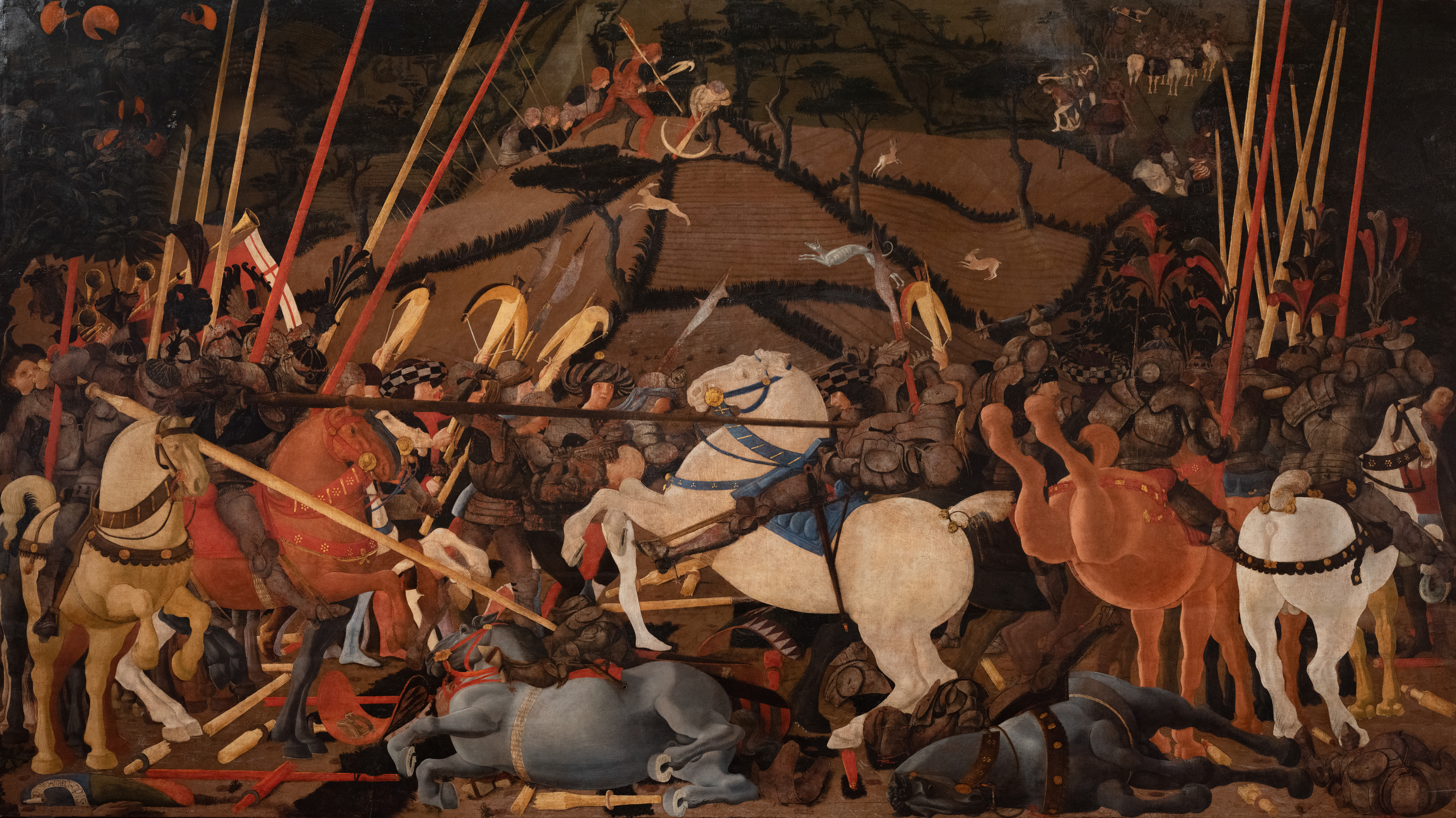
Paolo Uccello, Niccolò Mauruzi da Tolentino Unseats Bernardino della Carda at the Battle of San Romano (dating uncertain; c. 1435–1455)

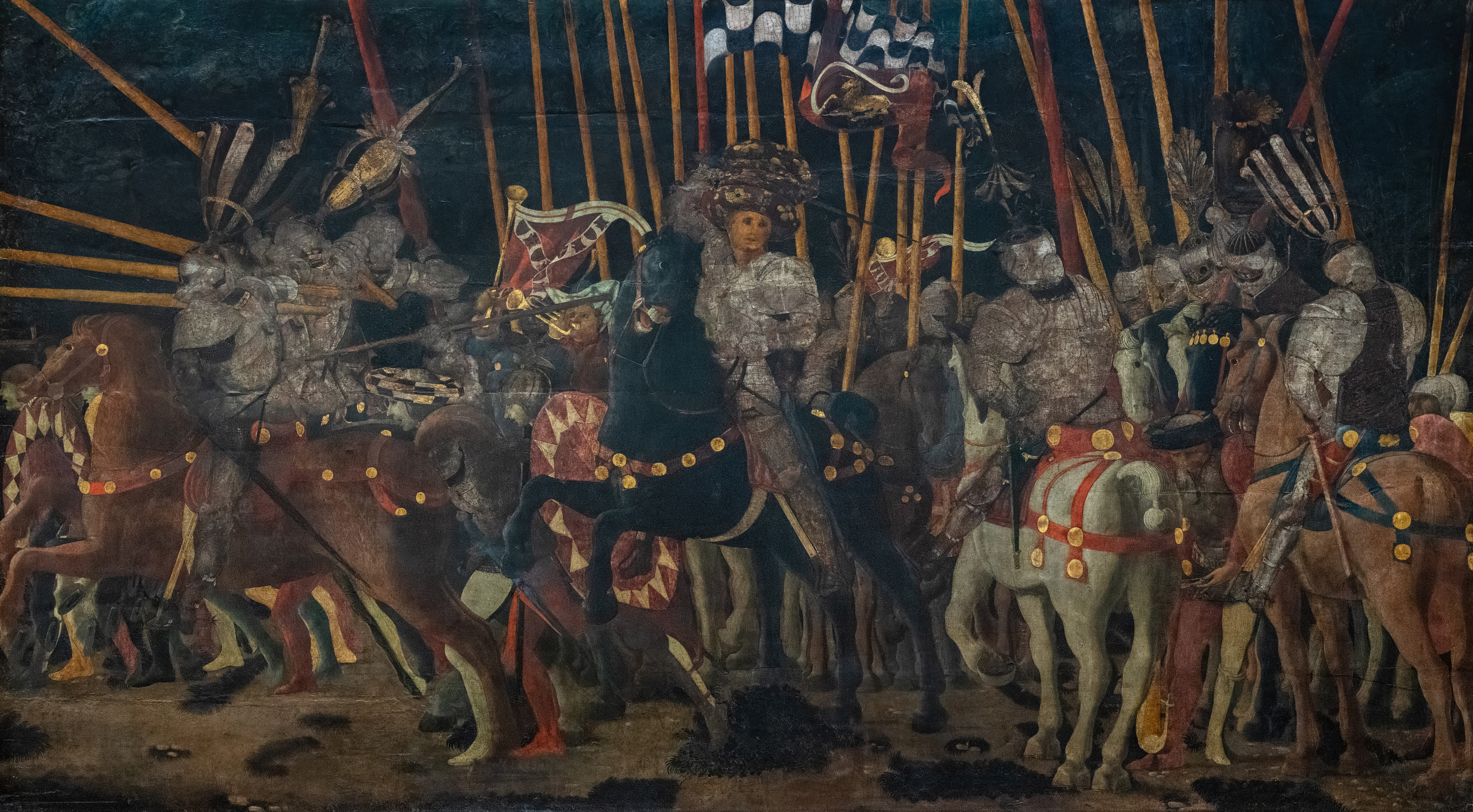
Paolo Uccello, The Counter-attack of Michelotto da Cotignola at the Battle of San Romano (c. 1455)

==== Filarete ====
Filarete was probably a pupil of Lorenzo Ghiberti during the casting of the North door of the Florentine Baptistery. In 1433, he travelled to Rome, where Pope Eugene IV commissioned him to create the Filarete door in St. Peter's Basilica, on which he worked until 1445.

In architecture, Filarete was responsible for the Filarete Tower at the Castello Sforzesco in Milan. He also designed the plan for Sforzinda, a city that was never built. Despite the many references to medieval symbolism incorporated into Sforzinda's design, the principle of the city became, during the Renaissance, the archetype of the humanist city. The treaty attracted the interest of important rulers such as Gian Galeazzo Sforza and Piero di Cosimo de' Medici. Later, when Francesco di Giorgio Martini and Leonardo da Vinci began planning their ideal cities, they borrowed ideas from Filarete.

Although Sforzinda was never built, its plan served as inspiration for many future city designs. In the 16th century, for example, military engineers and architects combined the features of Filarete's ideal city with the military defensive fortifications that were widely disseminated throughout Europe and beyond.

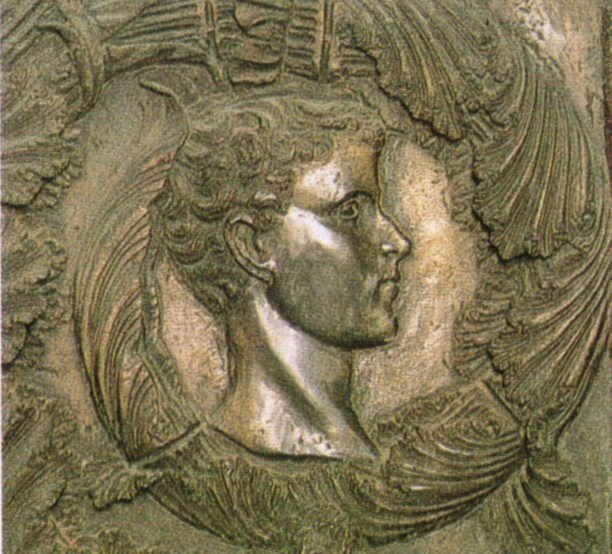
Filarete Door (in detail), St. Peter's Basilica, Rome

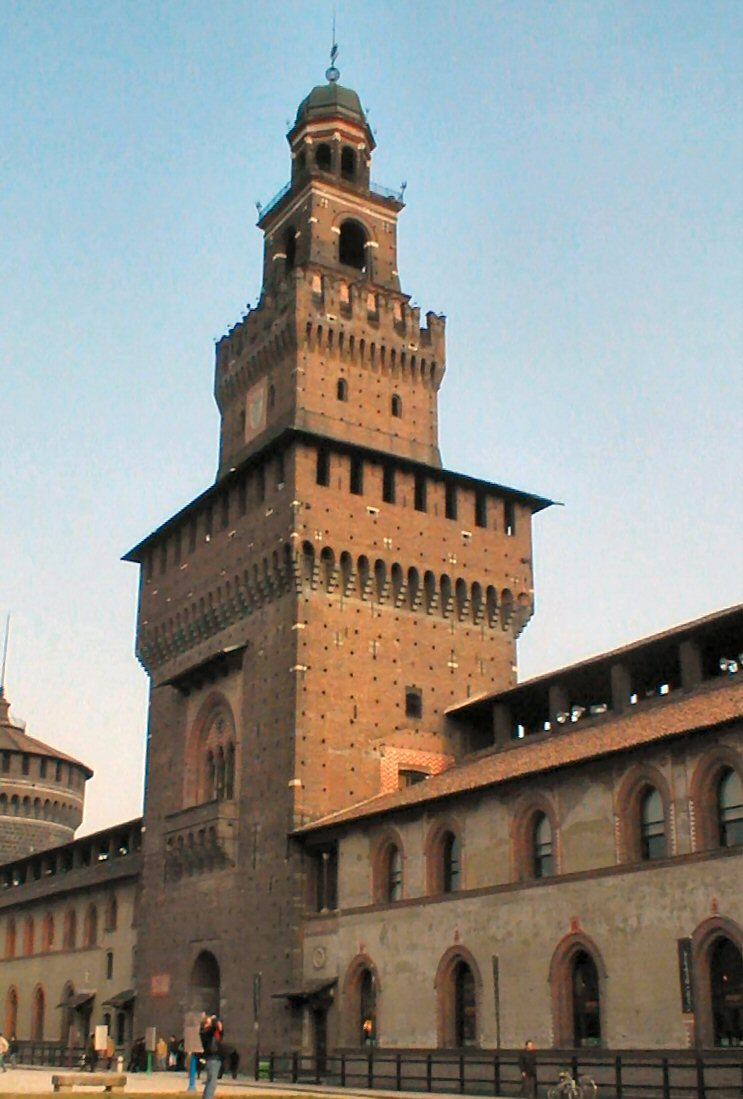
Filarete Tower, Castello Sforzesco, Milan

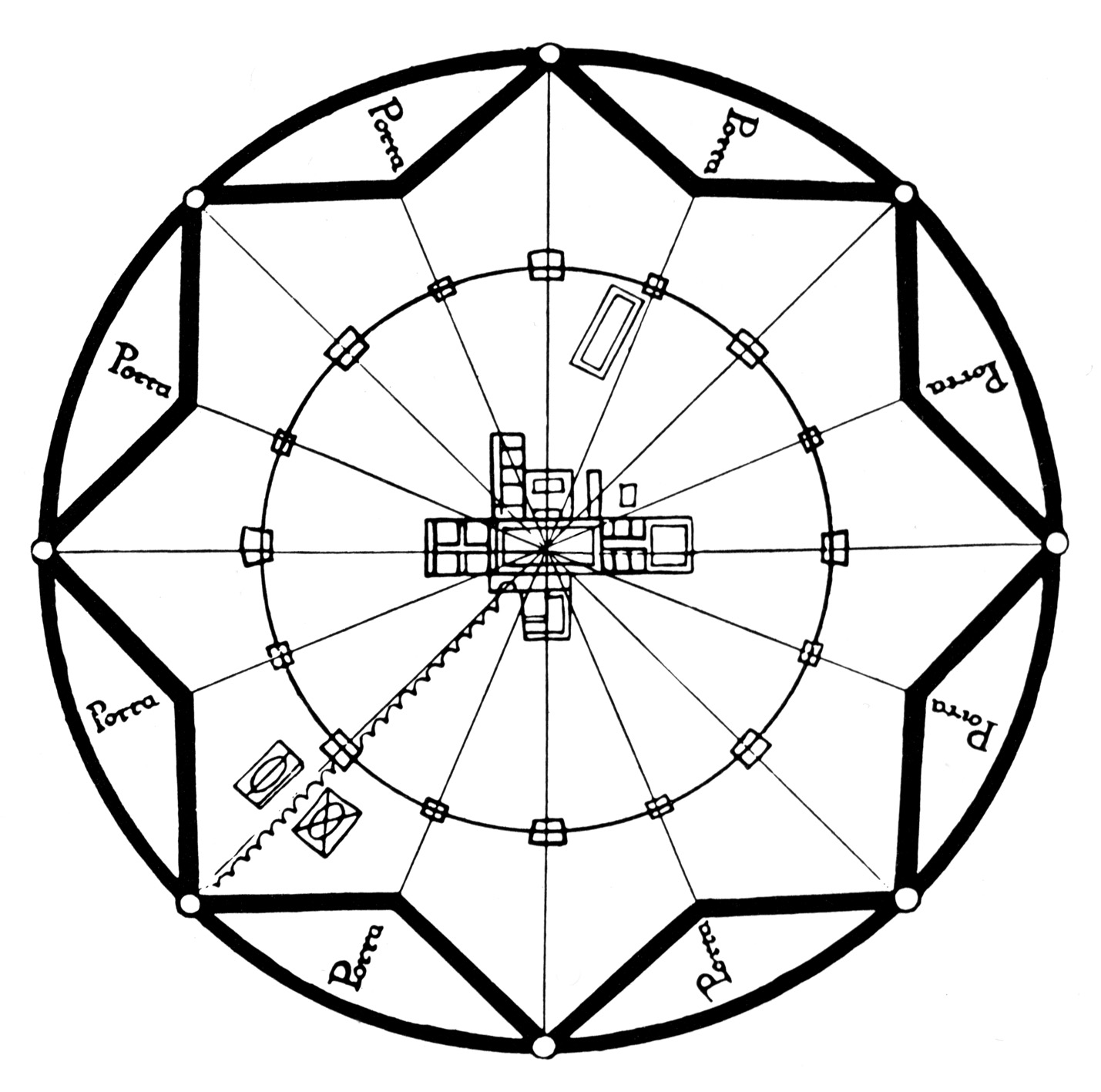
Plan of Sforzinda

== Years of the Medici's first presence (1440–1469) ==
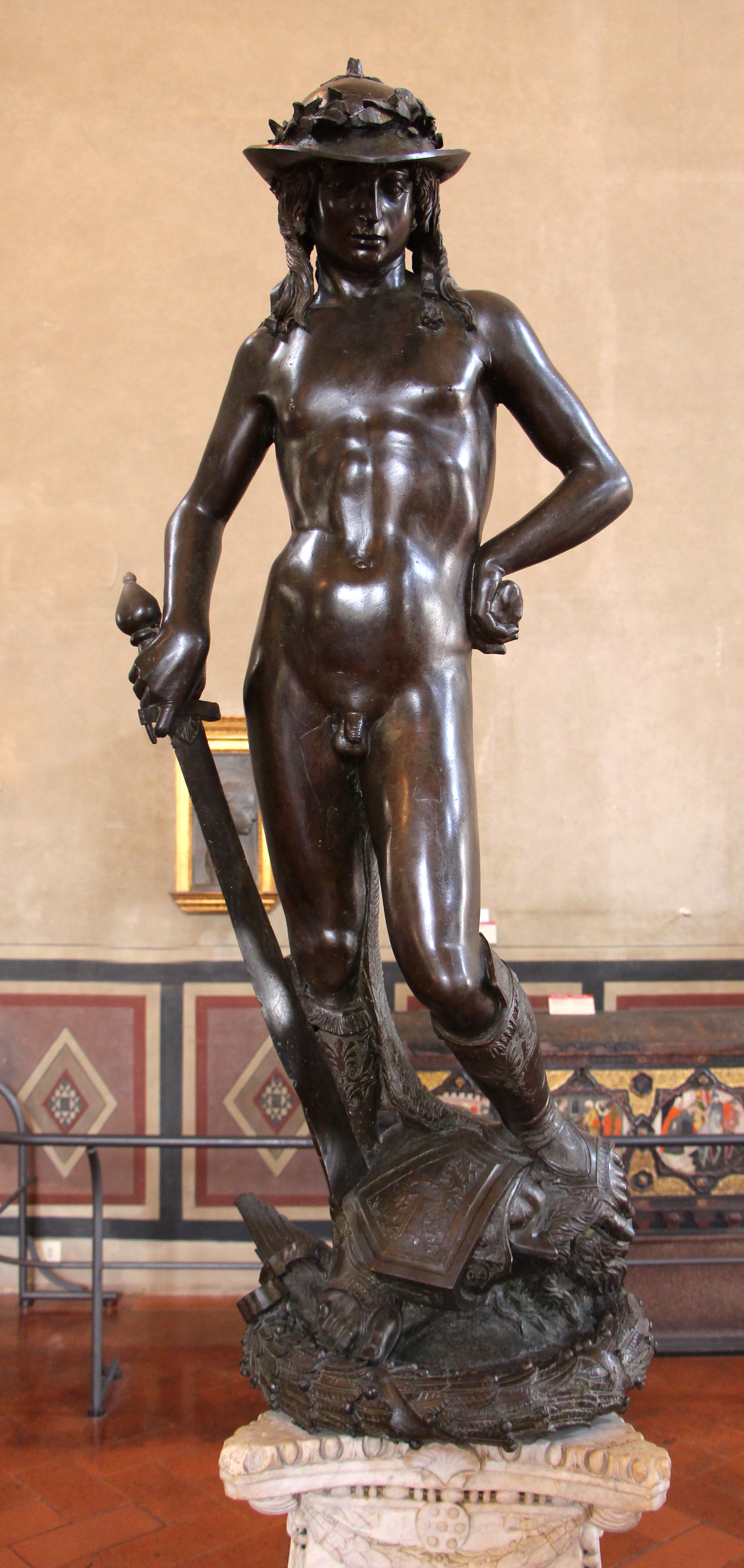
Donatello, David

The next generation of artists continued to spread the new style, influenced in its orientation by the social and political climate and by the new demands of clients.

=== The arts under Cosimo de' Medici ===
With Cosimo de' Medici's return from exile in 1434, the Florentine Republic remained in place, but Cosimo de' Medici gradually established his de facto power through a subtle strategy of alliances, enabling his most trusted men to control the decision-making bodies while remaining personally aloof from the city government. Cosimo's patronage of the arts began with him, and his behaviour resembled the Ciceronian Stoic model of seeking the common good and moderation, rejecting personal prestige and the display of wealth. Based on these principles, he commissioned major works, had Fra Angelico paint the frescoes of the San Marco convent and modernised the Palazzo Medici. He took a keen interest in art and science, and all Florence followed his example.

Private works have different characteristics, like Donatello's David, satisfying the demands of a cultivated environment. The figure's heroic nudity was revolutionary at the time, counterbalancing the androgynous nature of the sculpture. Thus, according to Giorgio Vasari, "It is so natural and of such beauty that it seems incredible to the artists that it was not moulded on a living model".

Cosimo conceived the idea of reviving "a kind of Academy": the Platonic Academy of Florence, (Note: The creation of the Platonic Academy of Florence was strongly supported and suggested by the Medici Neoplatonist author and thinker Marsilio Ficino, whose main patron was Cosimo de' Medici. The Italian philosopher drew up the first founding principles at the beginning of the quattrocento.) founded in 1459, which endorsed the intellectual trends and currents of culture by developing humanist disciplines. (Note: These are essentially based on two key axes: a conception of reality proceeding from aesthetics, and a dichotomous cosmogony determined by the individual, on the one hand, and by the universe, on the other.)

=== The arts under Piero di Cosimo de' Medici ===
Under Piero di Cosimo de' Medici, son of Cosimo, the taste for the "intellectual" became more pronounced. Public works tended to focus on the collection of precious and often small objects, sought more for their intrinsic value than for their rarity, demonstrating social prestige.

Piero de' Medici ruled Florence for five years (1464–1469). He adopted the refined fashions of the aristocratic courts, emulated by the city aristocracy.

The emblematic work of his era is the frescoes covering the walls of Benozzo Gozzoli's Magi Chapel, the private chapel of the Palazzo Medici (1459), decorated on his initiative. In the sumptuous procession of the Magi appear members of the Medici family and their supporters, transported into the sacred episode in which myth becomes a pretext for representing the glittering bourgeois society of the time.

Piero de' Medici was a pious man. In 1448, he commissioned Michelozzo to build the Tabernacle of the Crucifixion at San Miniato al Monte. Around 1450, he commissioned Michelozzo and Luca della Robbia to build his studiolo, which was destroyed in 1659. He was also a great bibliophile: Filarete tells us that he looked at his books "as if they were a pile of gold". He was also a scholar, like his father, the patron of Marsilio Ficino.

Sculptors often drew inspiration from the principle of copia and varietas theorised by Alberti, i.e., the reproduction of similar models with slight modifications and evolutions in order to satisfy taste through a donor fashion effect. In this respect, the evolution of funerary monuments is exemplary, from Bernardo Rossellino's tomb of Leonardo Bruni (1446–1450), through Desiderio da Settignano's tomb of Carlo Marsuppini (1450–1450) to Andrea del Verrocchio's tomb of Piero and Giovanni de' Medici (1472). In these works, starting from the common arcosolium model, ever more refined and precious results were attained.

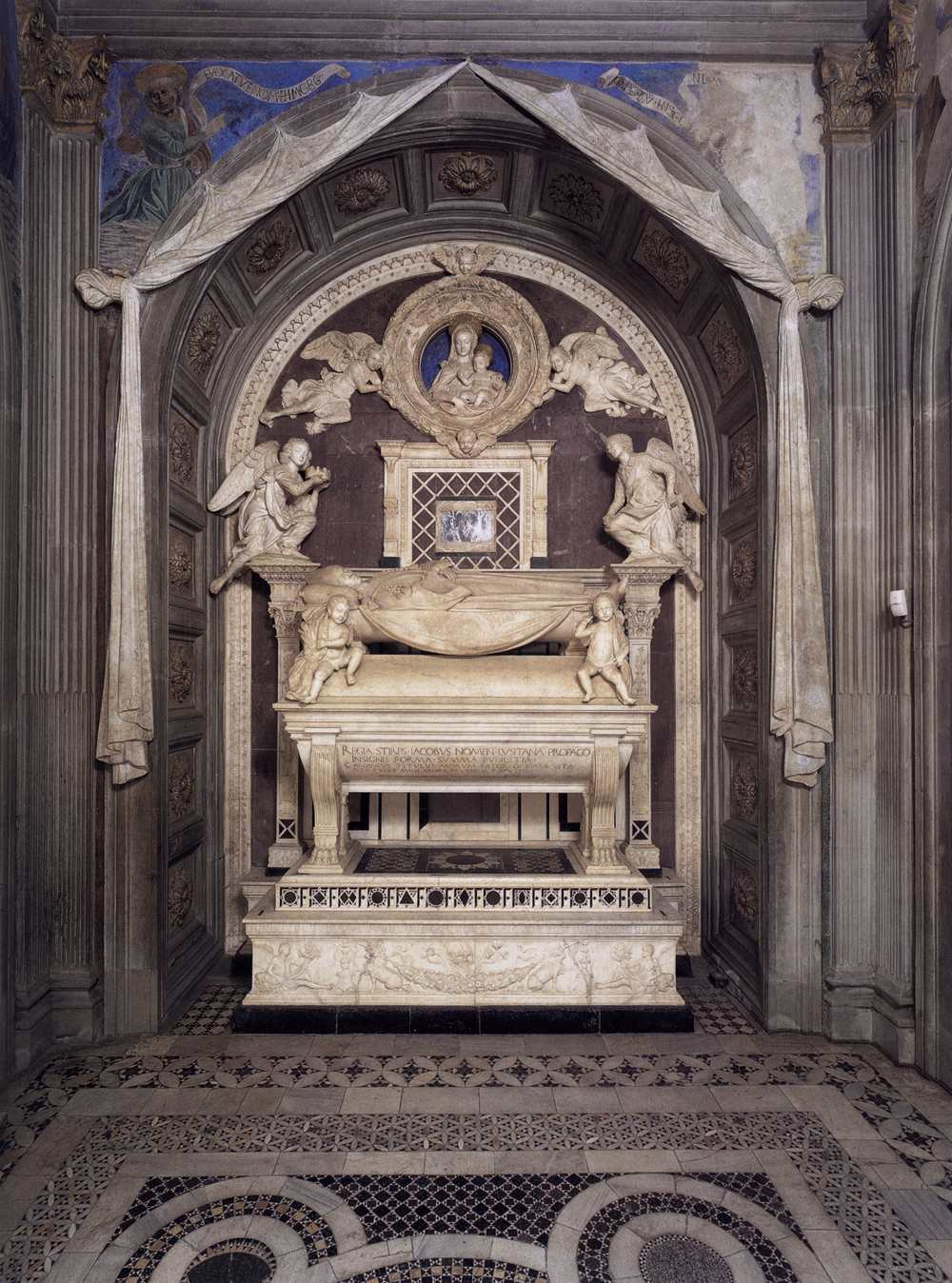
Tomb of the Cardinal of Portugal, San Miniato al Monte

One of the most significant works from this period is the Chapel of the Cardinal of Portugal at San Miniato al Monte, a celebration of James of Portugal, who died in Florence in 1458, and his royal household. The chapel is an example of the typical taste of mid–15th-century Florence, characterised by a diversity of materials, techniques, methods of expression and cultural references. Together, they create an elegant, finely staged effect. The architecture is in the form of a Greek cross, with each arm featuring a different decoration. The whole is unified by a continuous frieze featuring the Portuguese royal arms and by the use of porphyry and serpentine coating. All surfaces are decorated, from the cosmatesque pavement to the cloister-arched vault with terrecotte invetriate by Luca della Robbia.

The highlight is to the east, where the Cardinal's tomb sculpted by Antonio and Bernardo Rossellino is situated. The theatrical space is completed by a curtain held on either side of the great arch by two painted angels. Each decoration contributes to the staging of the Cardinal's "triumph of the afterlife". The overall style is characterised by the richness of the figures and their supple attitudes, creating an elegant animation never before seen. The modelling of the sculptures is highly sensitive, creating illusionistic effects, far removed from the rational research that had animated the Renaissance artists of the first generation. The relief on the base features one of the earliest examples of ancient myths reused in Neoplatonist and Christian doctrine: the bullfighting theme of Mithraist descent, a symbol of resurrection and moral strength, the charioteer on the chariot (a Neoplatonist symbol of thought that guides the soul and dominates the passions), the unicorns clashing (a symbol of virginity) and the genii seated on leonine heads (a symbol of strength). In the centre, above the garland, is a skull surrounded on either side by a lily and a palm, symbols of purity and the immortality of the soul. The symbolic ensemble alludes to the young prelate's moral virtues, victory over the passions and asceticism.

=== Fra Angelico ===
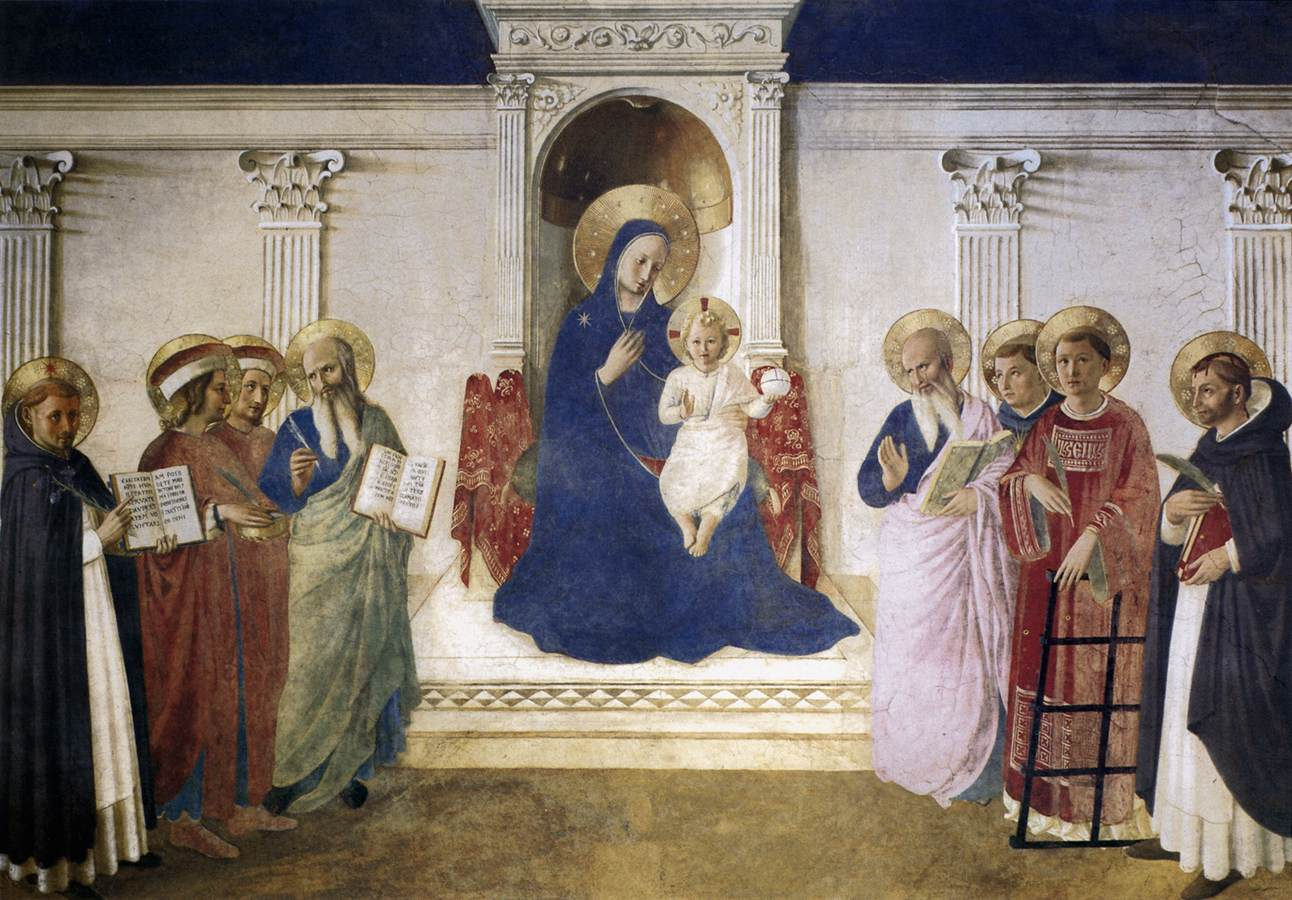
Fra Angelico, Madonna of the Shadows

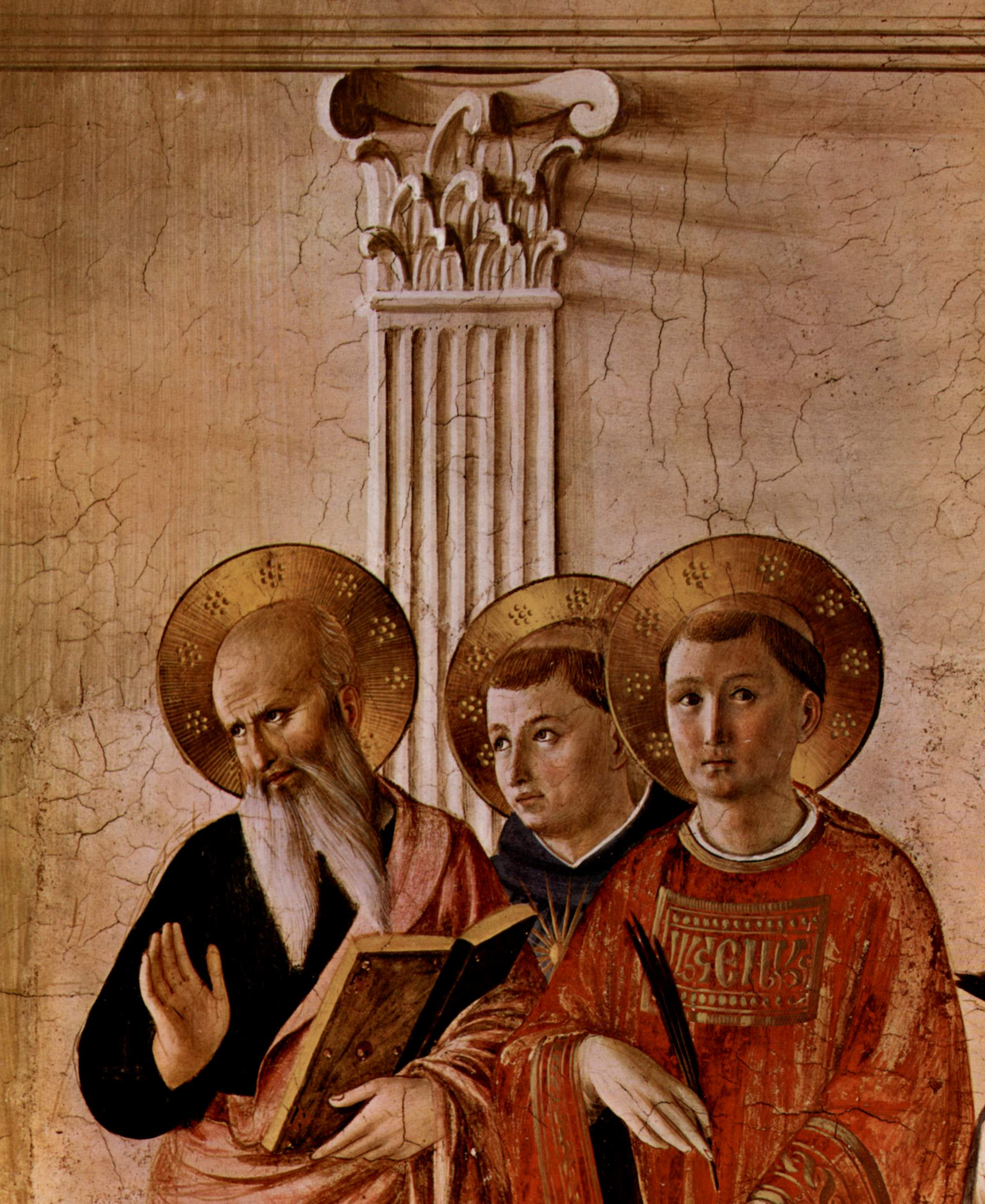
Detail of a capital and its shadows

Fra Angelico was one of Masaccio's first followers and, in his mature phase, played an important role in Florentine art. His Dominican Thomist background encouraged him to consolidate the advances of the Renaissance, especially the use of perspective and realism, with the values of the medieval world, such as the didactic function of art. In the 1440s, his production moved towards "light painting", influenced by Domenico Veneziano, with the rational use of light sources to arrange and unify all the elements of the scene.

Examples include the Coronation of the Virgin in the Louvre, with its predella in which typically Gothic rhythms and symmetries are updated by a powerful spatial composition and vivid colour, rich in highlights and shadows that give volume and sensitively highlight materials. His interest in the rendering of luminous phenomena led Fra Angelico in his mature phase to abandon indistinct, generic illumination in favour of a careful, rational rendering of light and shade, where each surface is associated with its own specific lustre.

His decoration of the convent of San Marco, financed by Cosimo de' Medici, which began in 1436 and lasted until the 1450s, was an important work for the Florentine Renaissance. Fra Angelico and his workshop created a cycle of frescoes that were intended to be a source of meditation and prayer for the monks. The scenes, intended for the monks' cells, show Saint Dominic, whose attitude serves as an example of how to behave in each episode: meditation, compassion, humility, prostration, etc.

Among the frescoes created for the convent's communal areas, the Madonna of the Shadows stands out for its originality. It is painted in the narrow corridor on the second floor, lit from the left by the light coming from a small window. Even in the painting, Fra Angelico seeks to use this same source of illumination, with the shadows of the painted capitals appearing lengthwise on the plaster, while on the right, the saints have the reflection of the window in their eyes.

=== Domenico Veneziano ===
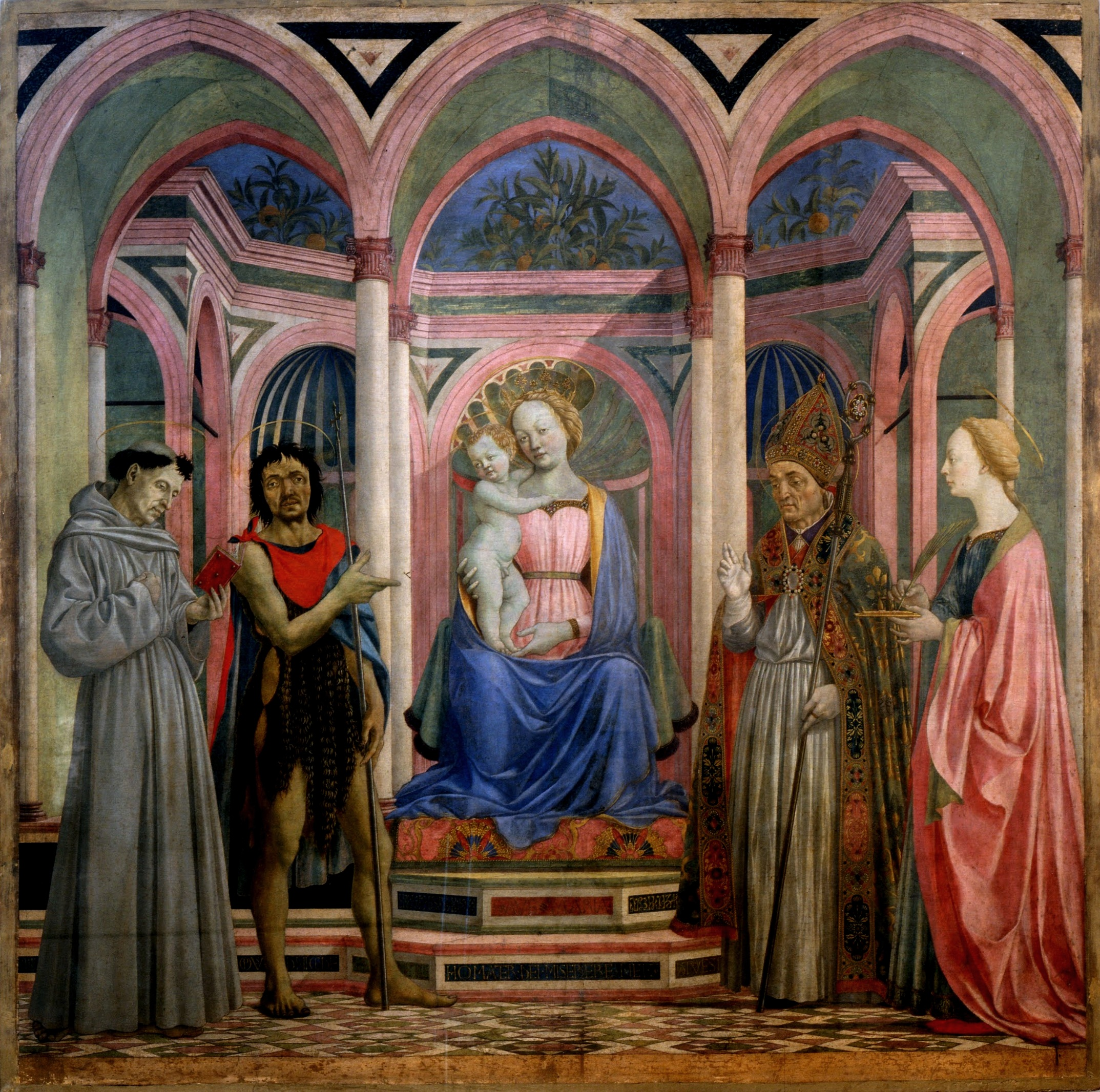
Domenico Veneziano, Santa Lucia de' Magnoli Altarpiece

Domenico Veneziano was one of the first Florentine artists to assimilate the characteristics of Early Netherlandish painting, which was particularly in vogue at the time and aroused considerable interest among collectors, as it met the taste for variety which was then dominant.

The artist's training is uncertain (Venice? But more likely Florence itself), but he acquired all the foundations available in Italy. An early example, commissioned by Piero di Cosimo de' Medici, is the tondo of the Adoration of the Magi (1438–1441), in which he adds space and volume to the elegance and sanctity of the International Gothic style, unifying the view from the small details in the foreground to the landscape in the background. The work must have pleased the client, for in the following years Domenico was commissioned to decorate the church of Sant'Egidio. The fresco cycle, in which Andrea del Castagno, Alesso Baldovinetti and the young Piero della Francesca also participated, has been lost. During these years, Domenico Veneziano developed a palette of light tones that seem to be imbued with pale light.

His masterpiece, the Santa Lucia de' Magnoli Altarpiece (1445–1447), demonstrates his complete mastery of the rules of linear perspective in this painting with three vanishing points. The dominant element of the painting, however, is the play of light falling from above, defining the volumes of the figures and architecture, and minimising linear suggestions: the profile of Saint Lucy, for example, stands out smoothly from the contour line thanks to the contrast of the glow against the green background.

=== Fra Filippo Lippi ===
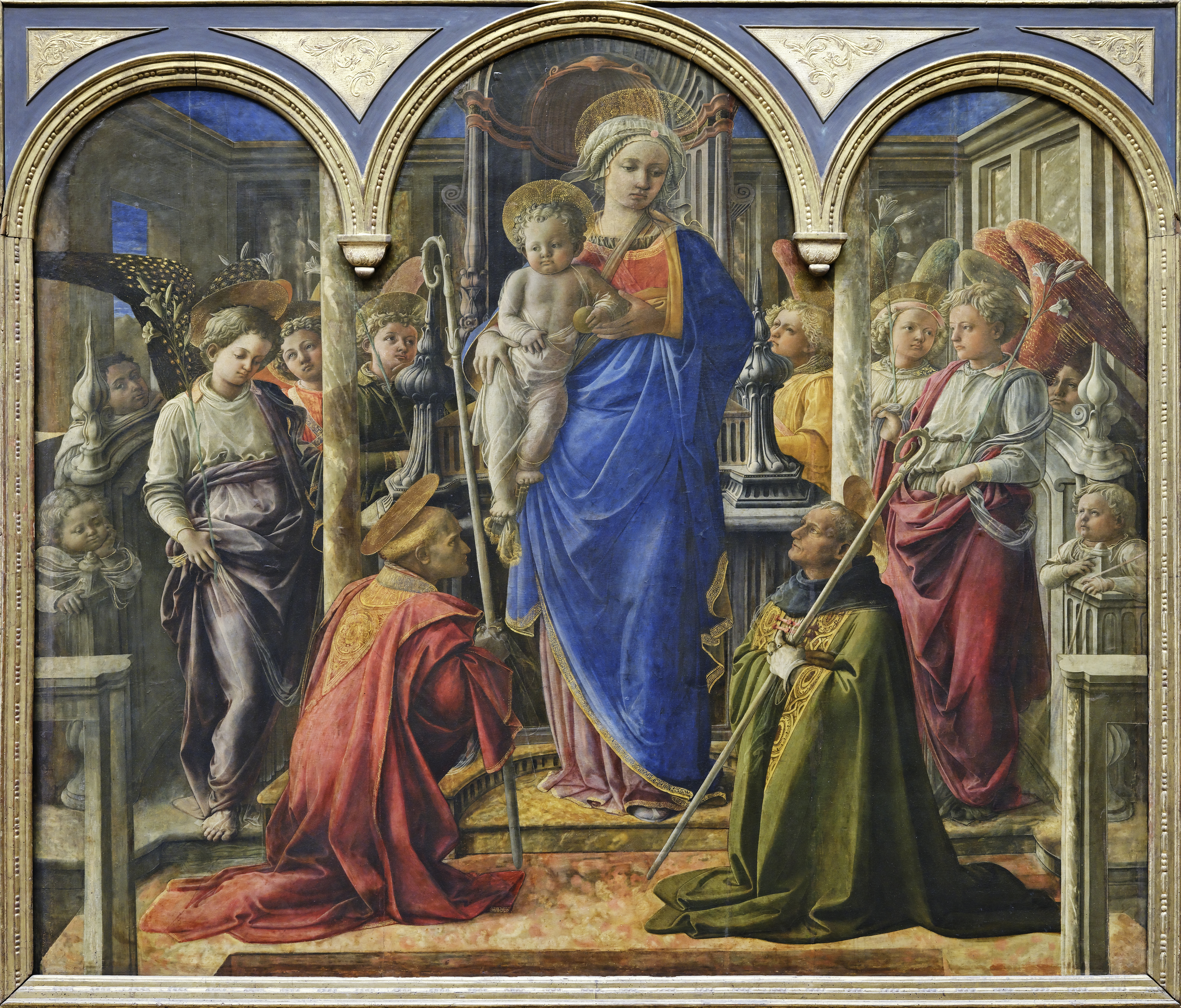
Fra Filippo Lippi, Barbadori Altarpiece

Fra Filippo Lippi was initially influenced by Lorenzo Monaco and, above all, by Masaccio. He mastered the expressions and postures of characters, and put into practice Brunelleschi's research into perspective. Later, Early Netherlandish painting and Fra Angelico also influenced his style.

After a stay in Padua, he returned to Florence in 1437 and painted the Madonna of Tarquinia, where his attention was focused on volumes, inspired by Masaccio, lighting effects, and the meticulously delineated landscape. The artist was also inspired by the Early Netherlandish masters, as can be seen in the details through the window on the left, the presence of precious objects and the cartellino at the base of the throne.

His art gradually moves towards linearity, as in the Barbadori Altarpiece (1438), where the unity of the scene is the result of the rhythmic evolution of the contours. Light seems to envelop the figures from the drawing in a chiaroscuro that restores relief in a more subdued manner.

The fresco cycle in Prato Cathedral depicting Stories of Saint Stephen and Saint John the Baptist (1452–1464) marks a turning point in Fra Filippo Lippi's career. In these scenes, human figures and their dynamism dominate the representation, with deep glimpses of architecture built from multiple vanishing points. The stories told are fluid and faithfully convey the human truth of the characters.

Fra Filippo Lippi had a great influence on Florentine artists, emphasising the research of poses and the predominance of contour. This dominant trend was opposed by a minority of artists who sought harmony between limpid colours and pure volumes, proposed by Domenico Veneziano, whose success lay mainly in Umbria and the Marche.

=== Andrea del Castagno ===
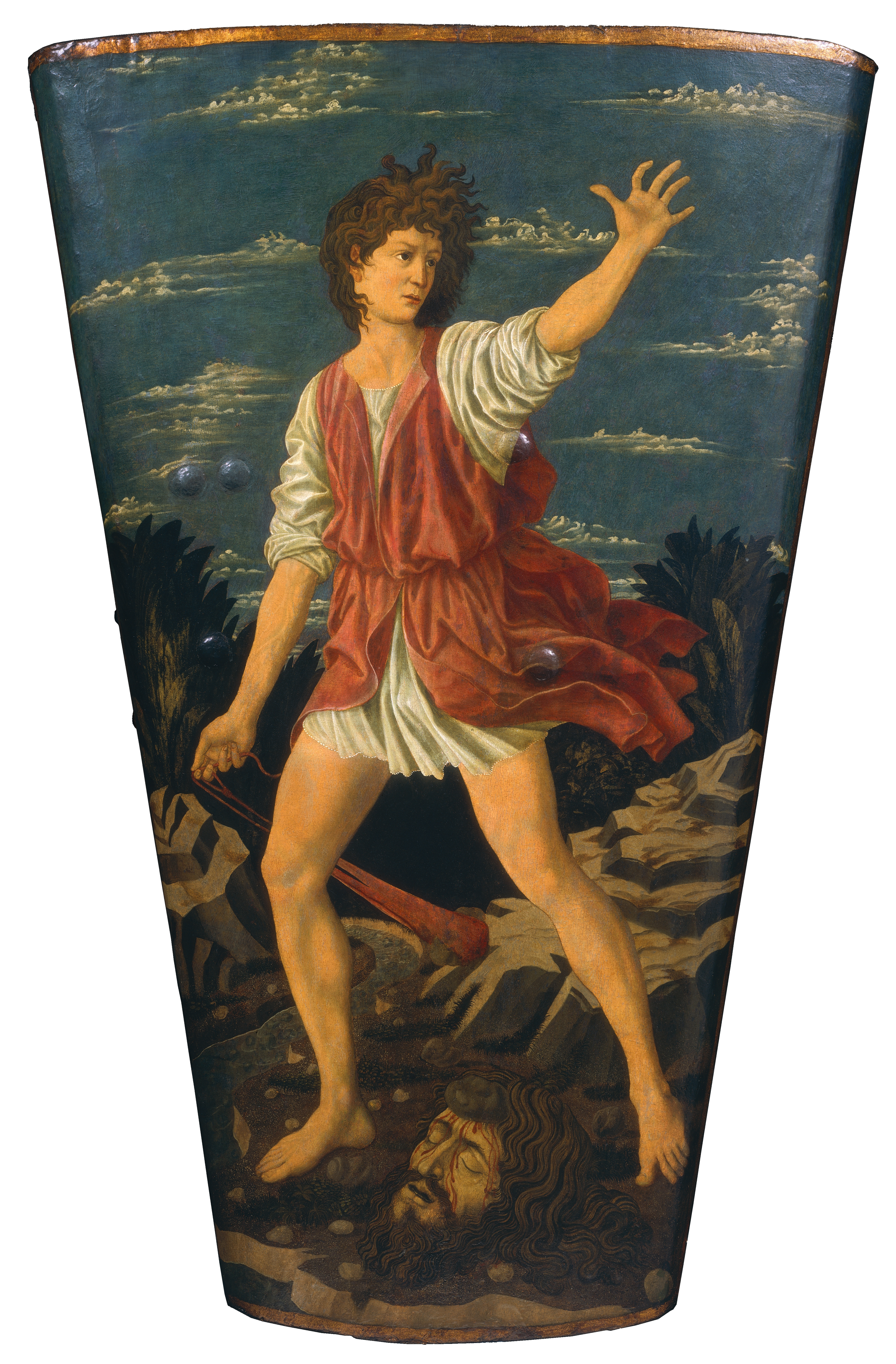
Andrea del Castagno, David with the Head of Goliath

Andrea del Castagno, close to Masaccio in terms of the power of the model, developed a rigorous style based on accentuated contrast and a more dramatic rendering through the use of high-contrast tints. His figures are realistic, and their sometimes exasperated attitudes reach expressionism.

His most representative work is the fresco painting in the Cenacolo di Sant'Apollonia in Florence, and particularly the Last Supper, with figures clearly delineated by a clear outline, highlighted by cold lateral illumination. The upper part of the cycle contains the Deposition, the Crucifixion and the Resurrection, which, despite their poor state of preservation, highlight episodes with a highly expressive atmosphere, going against the common image spread by Vasari "of an artist incapable of tenderness who, through his dark chromaticism, rendered the works rather raw and harsh".

In subsequent works, such as the Holy Trinity with Saints, he accentuates expressive values through the foreshortening of the Cross and the realism of the figures. His style, little appreciated in Florence where the dominant taste preferred the harmony of light hues, was the foundation of the Ferrarese school.

=== Leon Battista Alberti ===
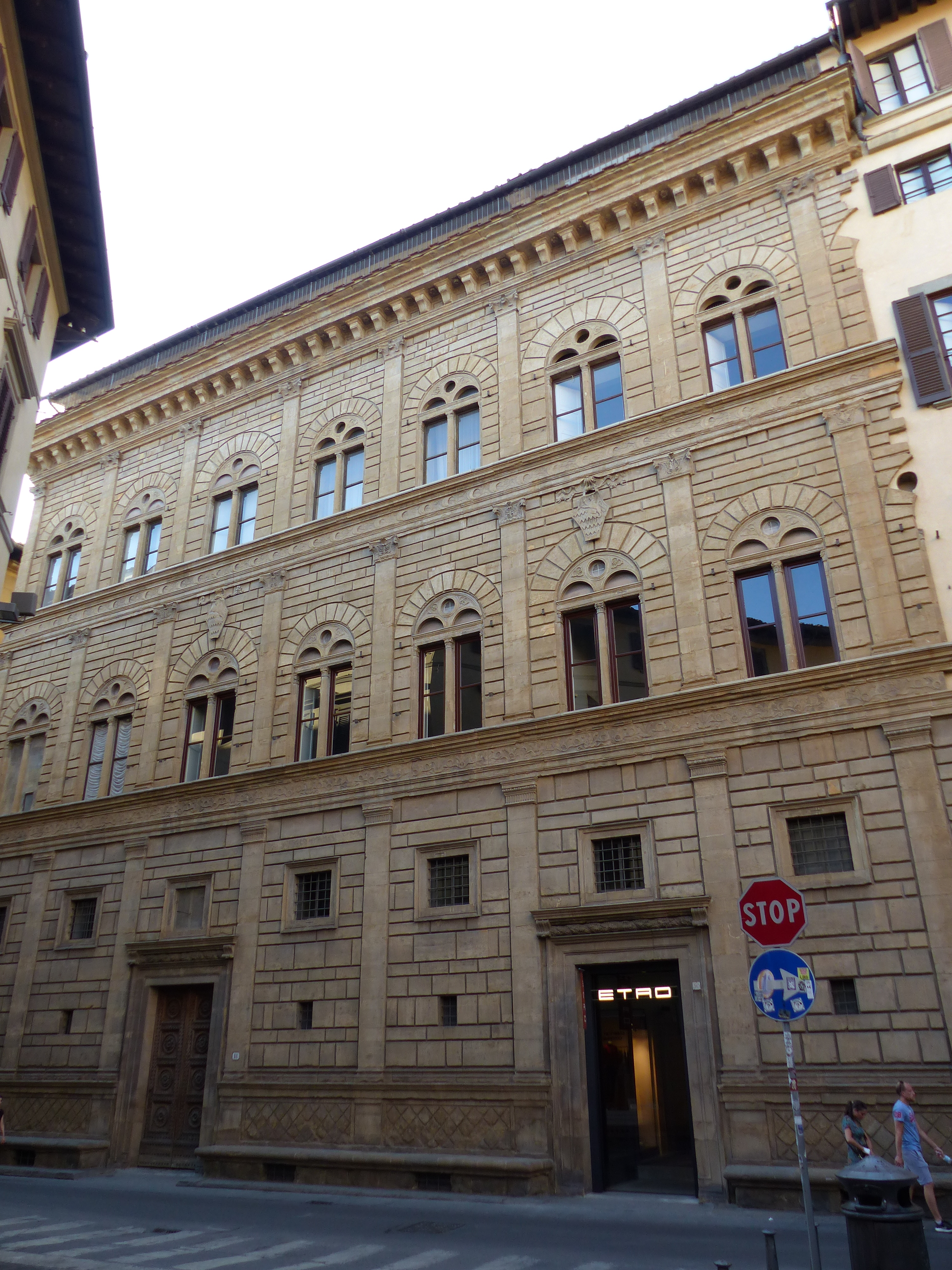
Palazzo Rucellai

In Florence, Leon Battista Alberti worked mainly as an architect for the wealthy merchant Giovanni Rucellai. Unlike Brunelleschi, Alberti approached architecture not as a practitioner, but as a researcher and theorist. Alberti's particular conception of architecture is based on a purely intellectual activity aimed at creating the project, without ensuring a constant presence on the building site. For him, architecture was a "practical philosophy" nourished by a range of literary, philosophical and artistic experiences, leading to meditations on ethics and aesthetics.

From 1447 onwards, he completed the Palazzo Rucellai, the facade of Santa Maria Novella (1456) and finally the Rucellai Sepulchre. These were always partial interventions that Alberti downplayed as "parietal decoration". At the Palazzo Rucellai, he unified various existing buildings, concentrating above all on the facade, composed of a grid of horizontal and vertical elements between which windows are inserted. Using classical elements such as portals, cornices and capitals, he added elements from the medieval tradition, such as the rustication and geminated windows, creating a varied and elegant aesthetic result, thanks to the variation of light between the light, smooth areas of the lesene and the dark areas of the openings and grooves of the rustication.

At Santa Maria Novella, the facade has remained unfinished since 1365, its progress reaching as far as the first order of arcades, with certain elements such as the rose window already defined. Alberti seeks to integrate the old with the new, continuing the inlaid decoration in bichromatic marble and leaving the small lower arcades, inserting a classical portal in the centre (derived from that of the Pantheon), with pillar-column motifs on the sides. The upper area is separated from the lower by a cornice with a square inlaid band. The two side volutes act as connectors. The whole is governed by the principle of modular composition based on the use of the square and its multiples, mitigated by a few asymmetries such as the decentring of certain vertical elements and the inlay on the attic.

Even for the tempietto del Santo Sepolcro, Giovanni Rucellai's funeral monument, Alberti used the white and green marble marquetry of the Florentine Romanesque tradition, creating a classical structure whose dimensions are derived from the golden ratio.

=== The return of Donatello ===
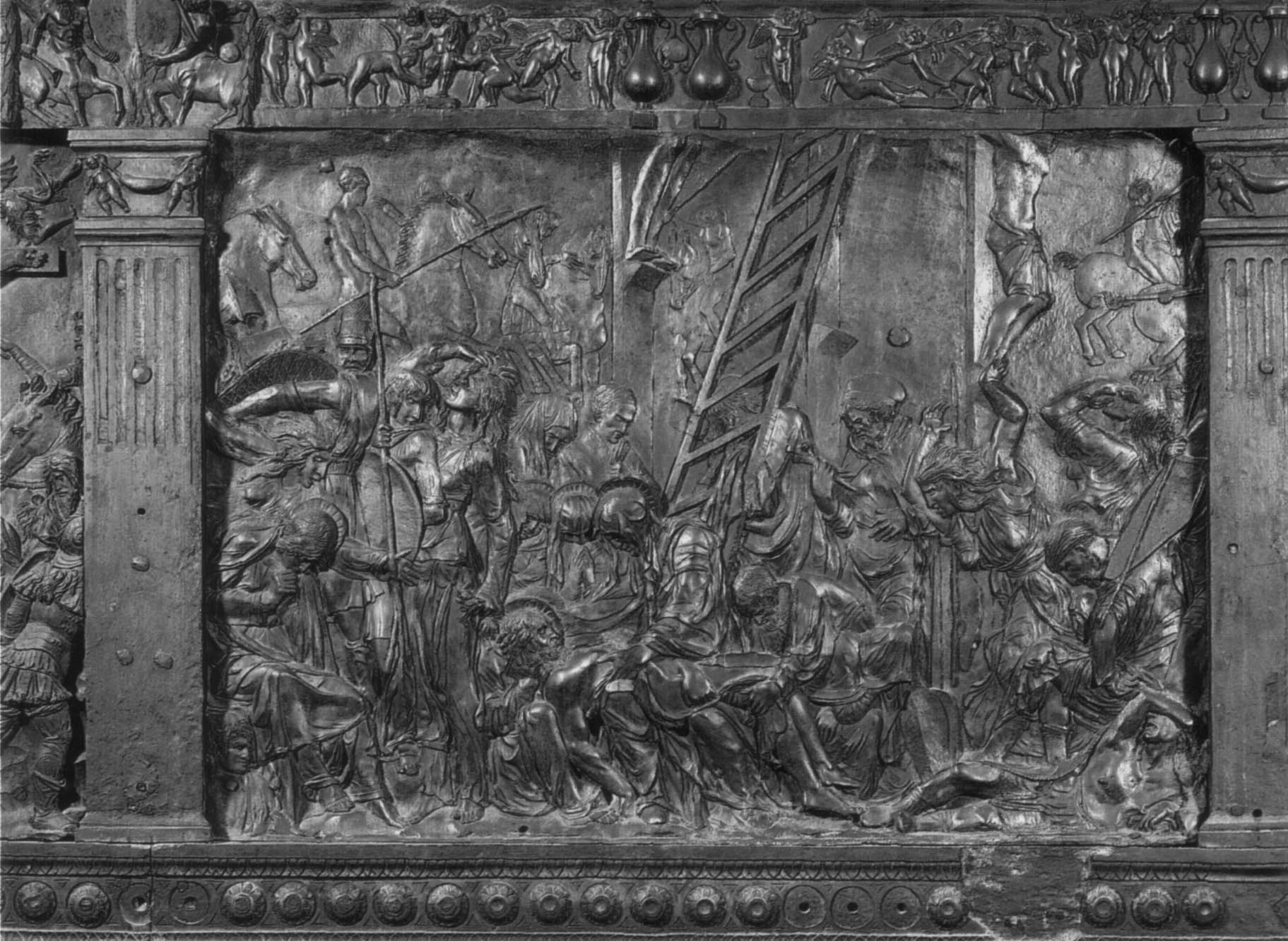
Donatello, Pulpit of the Passion, panel from the Compianto (1460–1466)

The gap between the artists of the first humanism and those of the new generation, oriented towards a varied and decorated artistic taste, became evident when Donatello returned from Padua in 1453, after a ten-year stay. His poignant Penitent Magdalene (1453–1455), with its rough realism and disfigurement caused by asceticism and old age, could not be more outmoded compared to Desiderio da Settignano's contemporary work, which focuses on naturalism and aesthetics.

Donatello thus found himself isolated in Florence and received his last commission, the two pulpits in San Lorenzo, thanks to the intervention of Cosimo de' Medici. In the Pulpit of the Passion (1460–1466), in scenes such as the Lamentation and Deposition, the artist ignores the rules of perspective, order and harmony. It is difficult to distinguish the main characters in the mass of figures. The composition cuts off parts of the scene, such as the crucified thieves, whose feet alone are visible, giving the sensation of an indeterminate space, amplifying the unbalanced, dramatic pathos of the scene.

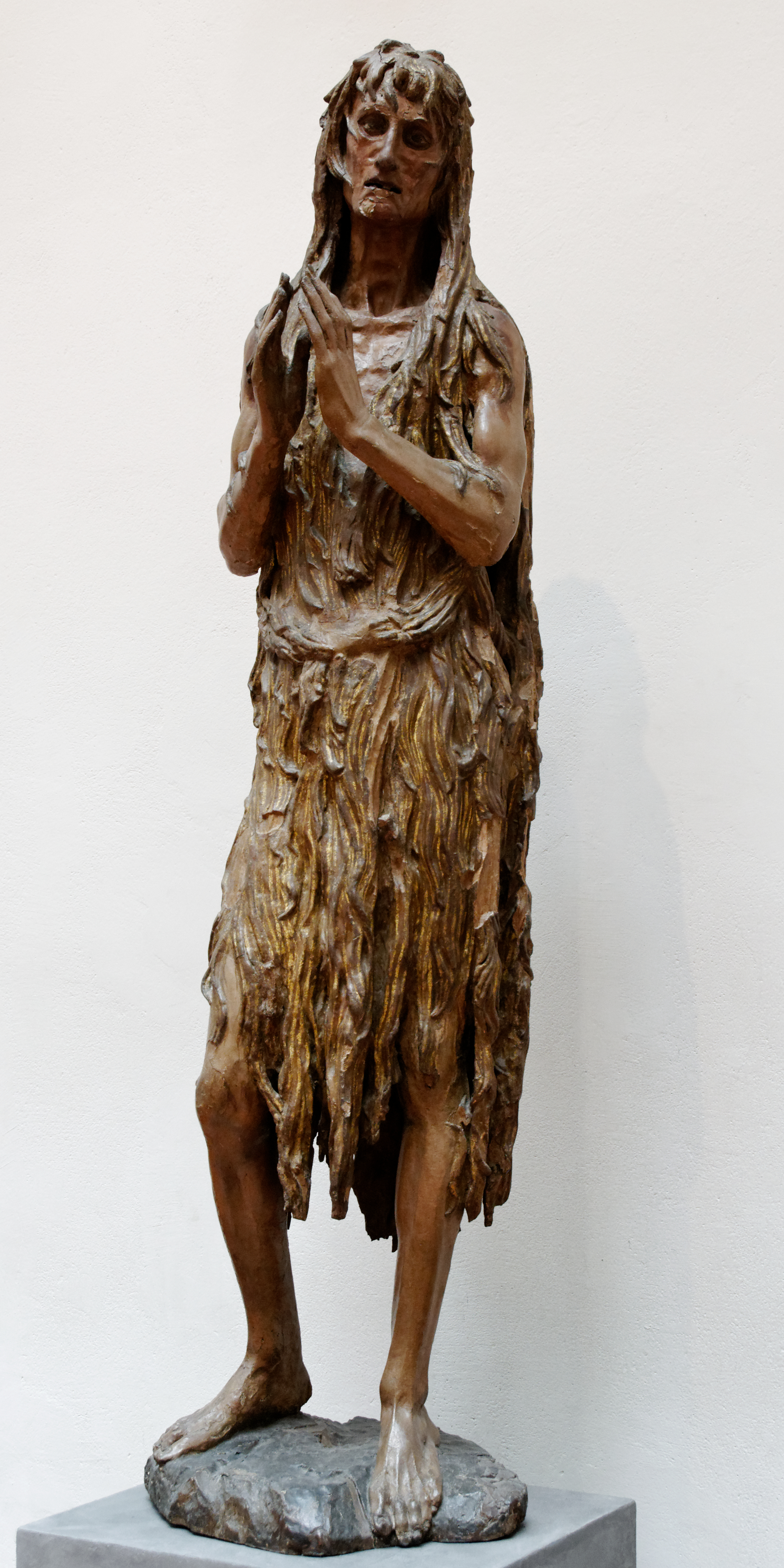
Donatello, Penitent Magdalene

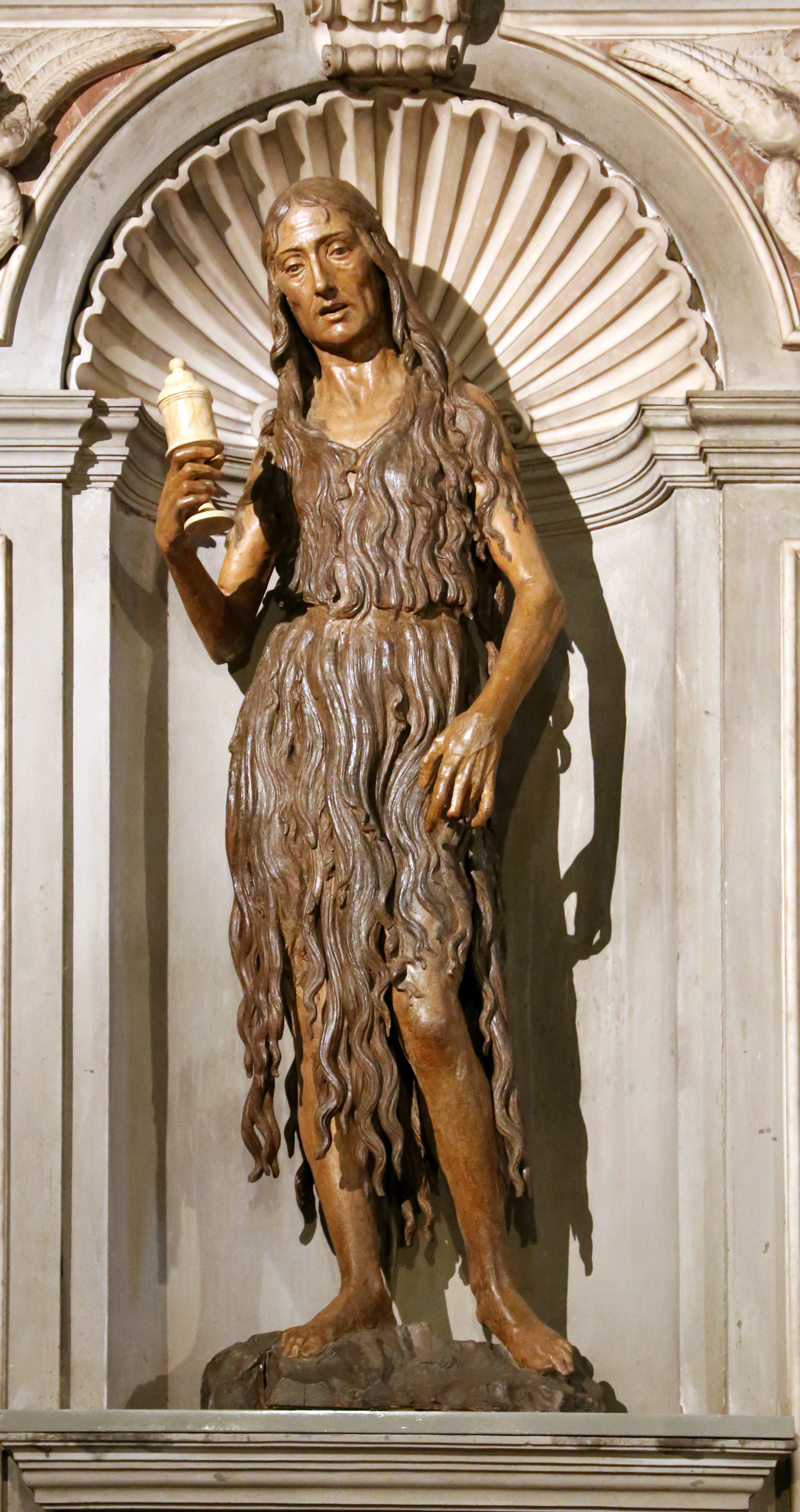
Desiderio da Settignano, Penitent Magdalene, Santa Trinita

=== The artist and the workshop ===
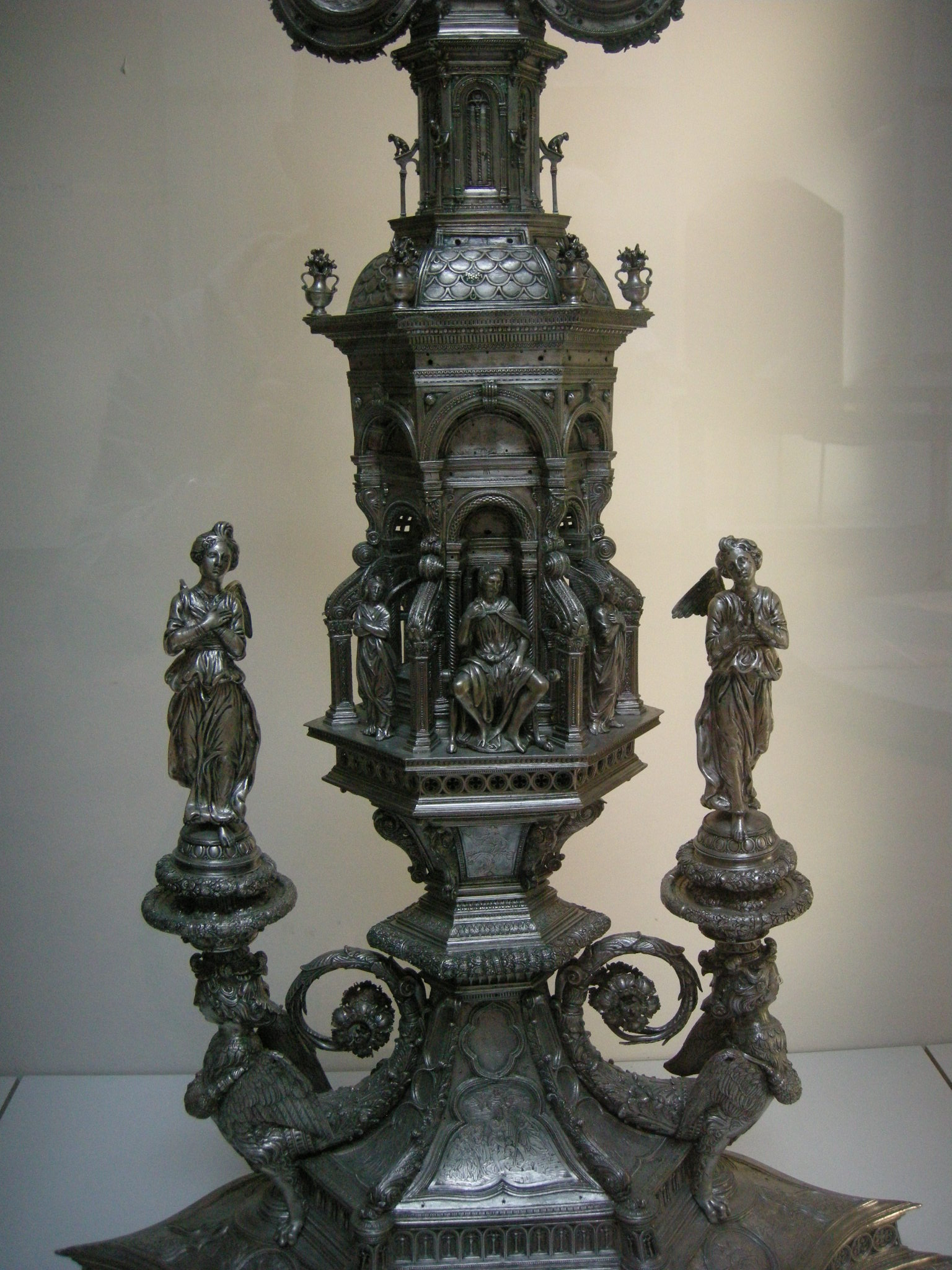
The lantern in Florence's Duomo, reproduced in Antonio del Pollaiuolo's Silver Cross

The quattrocento saw an important evolution in the image of the artist. The figure of the manual craftsman producing "objects" on commission evolved towards a more intellectual conception aspiring to become part of the liberal arts. Writings on the theory of Leon Battista Alberti played a fundamental role. Already, in De pictura, Alberti paints a portrait of the cultivated, literate, technically adept artist who masters all phases of the work, from idealisation to manual realisation. His portrayal is nevertheless idealised, and would only become truly effective in the 18th century with the dichotomy between artist and craftsman and the distinction between major and minor arts, which in the quattrocento were still unrecognised.

The basic unit of artistic production was the bottega (workshop), which was simultaneously the place of production, trade and formation. The master's journey began in the workshop, where apprentices entered at a very young age, between thirteen and fifteen, in practical contact with the basics of the trade, starting with the humblest tasks such as cleaning and tidying tools, then progressively taking part in the creation and realisation of works. The practice of drawing is essential, whatever the art chosen. Theoretical preparation was limited to a few basic notions of mathematics and geometry. Complex processes such as linear perspective were learned empirically, without any knowledge of theoretical principles.

Botteghe were involved in two types of production:

- Works commissioned by contract, in which the characteristics of the object, the materials used, the execution time and the terms of payment are precisely listed. The workshop often has complete freedom in matters of composition and style;
- Routine production and marketing, such as wedding cassoni, birth trays, votive images and furniture, which were usually produced without a specific order. Mass-produced pieces, such as Madonnas in stucco, raw terracotta or invetriata, were made from moulds, templates and matrices.

In this case, the products were often copies of well-known original works. Even the most innovative pieces ended up in the common catalogue and were thus reproduced. Motifs were taken up and revisited in all disciplines, and models were frequently found indiscriminately in painting, sculpture, architecture and goldsmiths' and silversmiths' work, such as the miniature reproduction of the lantern of the Duomo in the Silver Cross at the Museo dell'Opera del Duomo, as well as in reliquaries, candelabras and monstrances.

== The Laurentian period (1470–1492) ==
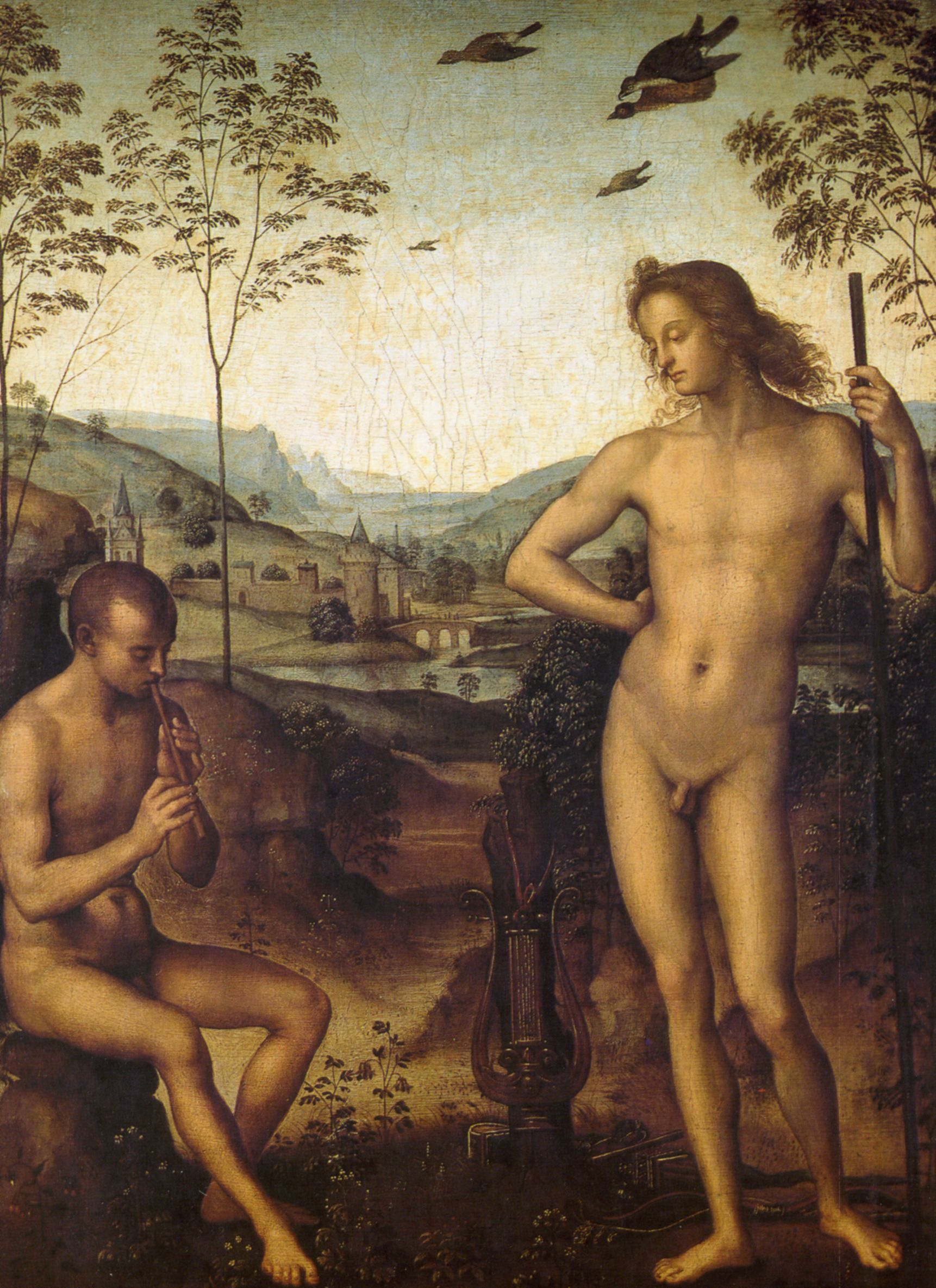
Pietro Perugino, Apollo and Daphnis (c. 1480–1490)

The end of the 15th century saw a slowing down in the innovative process, as taste took on more varied forms compared to the rigour of the early years.

In sculpture, Benedetto da Maiano, an interpreter of measure between idealisation, naturalism and virtuosity, created a series of busts with flexible lines and rich descriptive details. In painting, Domenico Ghirlandaio added a touch of sensitivity and realism.

Around 1472, Benedetto Dei's Cronache ('Chronicles') lists more than forty painters' workshops, forty-four goldsmiths, over fifty maestri intagliatori (sculptors) and over eighty legnaiuoli di tarsie (cabinetmakers) in Florence. This large number of workshops can be explained by the high demand for work, both in Florence and in other centres of the Italian peninsula. From the 1480s onwards, the greatest Florentine masters were called upon to work abroad on prestigious projects such as the decoration of the Sistine Chapel in Rome and Verrocchio's equestrian monument to Bartolomeo Colleoni in Venice.

For the artists of the "third generation", linear perspective was already a fact, and research now turned to other areas of interest, such as the dynamic problems of figure masses or the tension of contour lines. Isolated, plastic figures, perfectly balanced in a measurable, immobile space, now gave way to a continuous play of moving forms, with greater tension and expressive intensity.

The figurative production and dissemination of the ideas of the Accademia Neoplatonica, thanks in particular to the writings of Marsilio Ficino, Cristoforo Landino and Pico della Mirandola, gave rise, among the various doctrines, to those linked to the pursuit of harmony and beauty as a means of accessing higher forms of human or divine love, and happiness. The attempt to reinstate classical philosophy in the field of Christian religion also led to a re-reading of myths as vectors of truth and witnesses to an inaccessible harmony. As a result, mythological scenes began to be commissioned, entering the field of privileged subjects in the figurative arts.

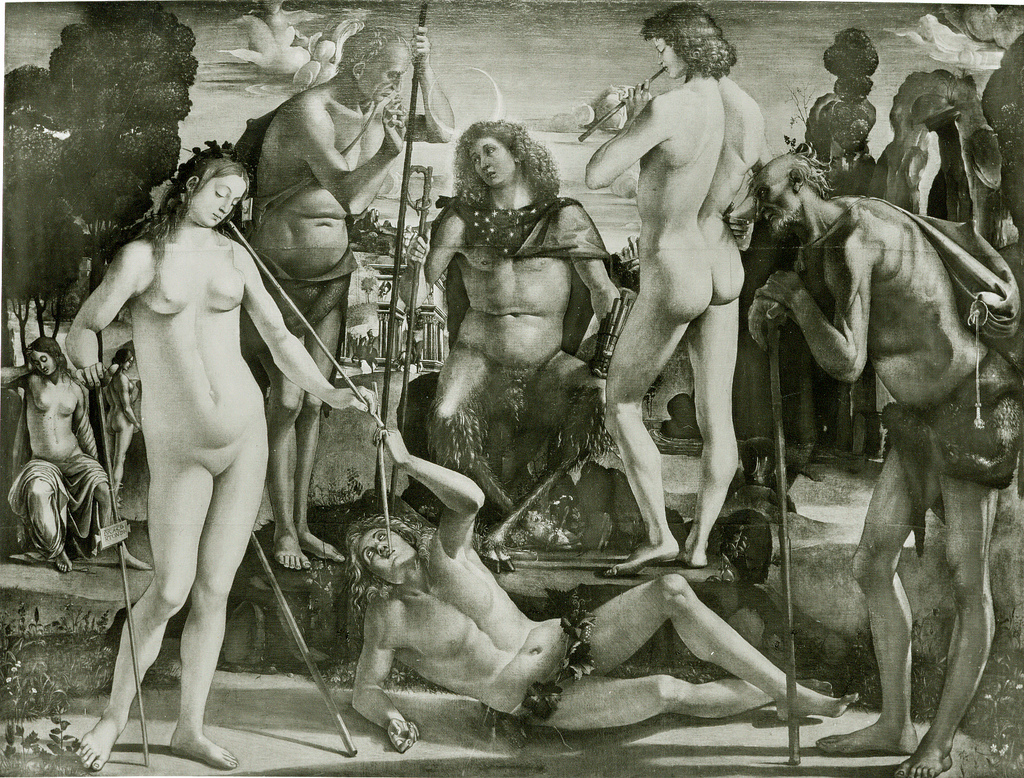
Luca Signorelli, The Education of Pan (c. 1490)

Lorenzo the Magnificent's relationship with art differed from that of his grandfather Cosimo de' Medici: he favoured the creation of public works. On the one hand, for Lorenzo, art had an important public function, but one turned towards foreign states, as an ambassador for the cultural prestige of Florence, presented as the "new Athens". To this end, he promoted systematic literary diffusion of Tuscan poetry from the Duecento onwards, such as the Raccolta-aragonese to Alfonso V of Aragon, and figurative art, by sending the best artists to the Italian courts. These actions fostered the myth of the Laurentian era as a "golden age", enhanced by the period of peace he managed to maintain until his death, but on the other hand, these actions were also responsible for the weakening of artistic vivacity in Florence, by favouring the rise of other centres, in particular Rome, as a focus for novelties.

Furthermore, Lorenzo, through his patronage, encouraged a taste for objects rich in philosophical meaning, establishing an intense, daily confrontation with the artists in his circle, seen as creative authorities on beauty. The result is a sophisticated and scholarly precious language in which allegorical, mythological, philosophical and literary meanings are intricately linked, readable only by the elite who possess the interpretive keys. This difficulty means that today, certain meanings of emblematic works escape us. Art detached itself from public and civil life, focusing on ideals of evasion of everyday existence tending towards harmony and serenity.

References to Lorenzo in the works are frequent, but hidden behind allusions. In Perugino's Apollo and Daphnis (1483), for example, Daphnis is the Greek version of the name Laurus ('Lorenzo'). Likewise, Luca Signorelli's The Education of Pan (c. 1490) addresses the theme of the incarnation of the god Pan, the Medici family's bearer of peace, as in the verses recited by court poets.

=== Architecture ===
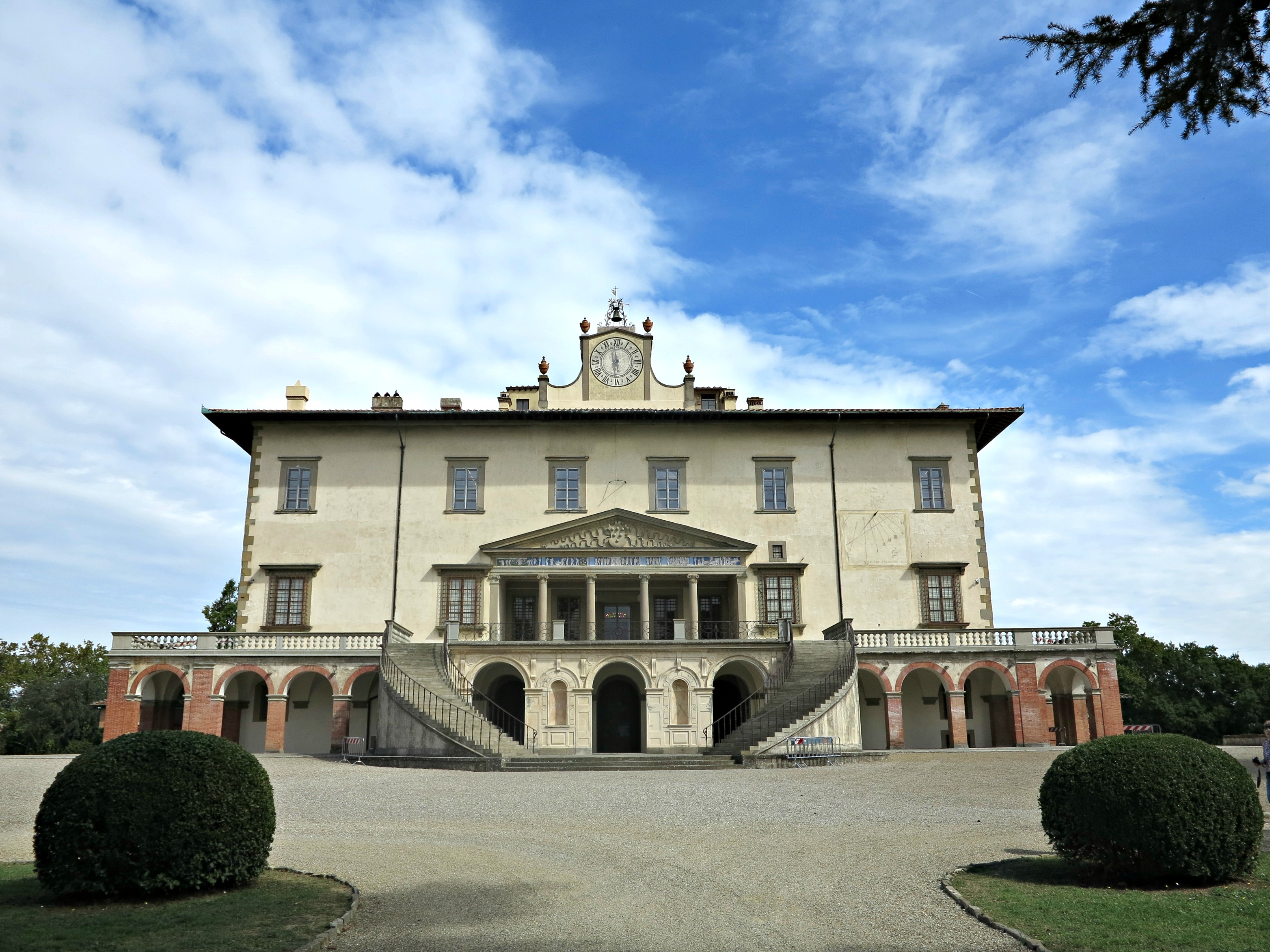
The Villa Medici, Poggio a Caiano

The Villa Medici at Poggio a Caiano was one of Lorenzo de' Medici's most important projects. The villa was commissioned around 1480 from Giuliano da Sangallo. Its piano nobile is developed with terraces on all sides, starting from a base surrounded by a loggia with a continuous arcade. The volume has a square base over two floors, with a large central salon whose height is the same as the height of two floors, with a barrel vault instead of the traditional courtyard. The roof is simple, projecting over the walls on either side, with no cornice.

The façade features an Ionic tympanum that leads to a loggia-vestibule with a barrel-vaulted, coffered ceiling. Inside, the rooms are arranged symmetrically around the salon.

The villa is open to the garden owing to the loggia, which allows a gradual transition from the inside to the outside. This feature, combined with ancient techniques such as barrel vaulting and Ionic elements, made the villa at Poggio a Caiano a model for private villa architecture, which was exported to other towns in the Veneto and to Rome.

=== Antonio del Pollaiuolo ===
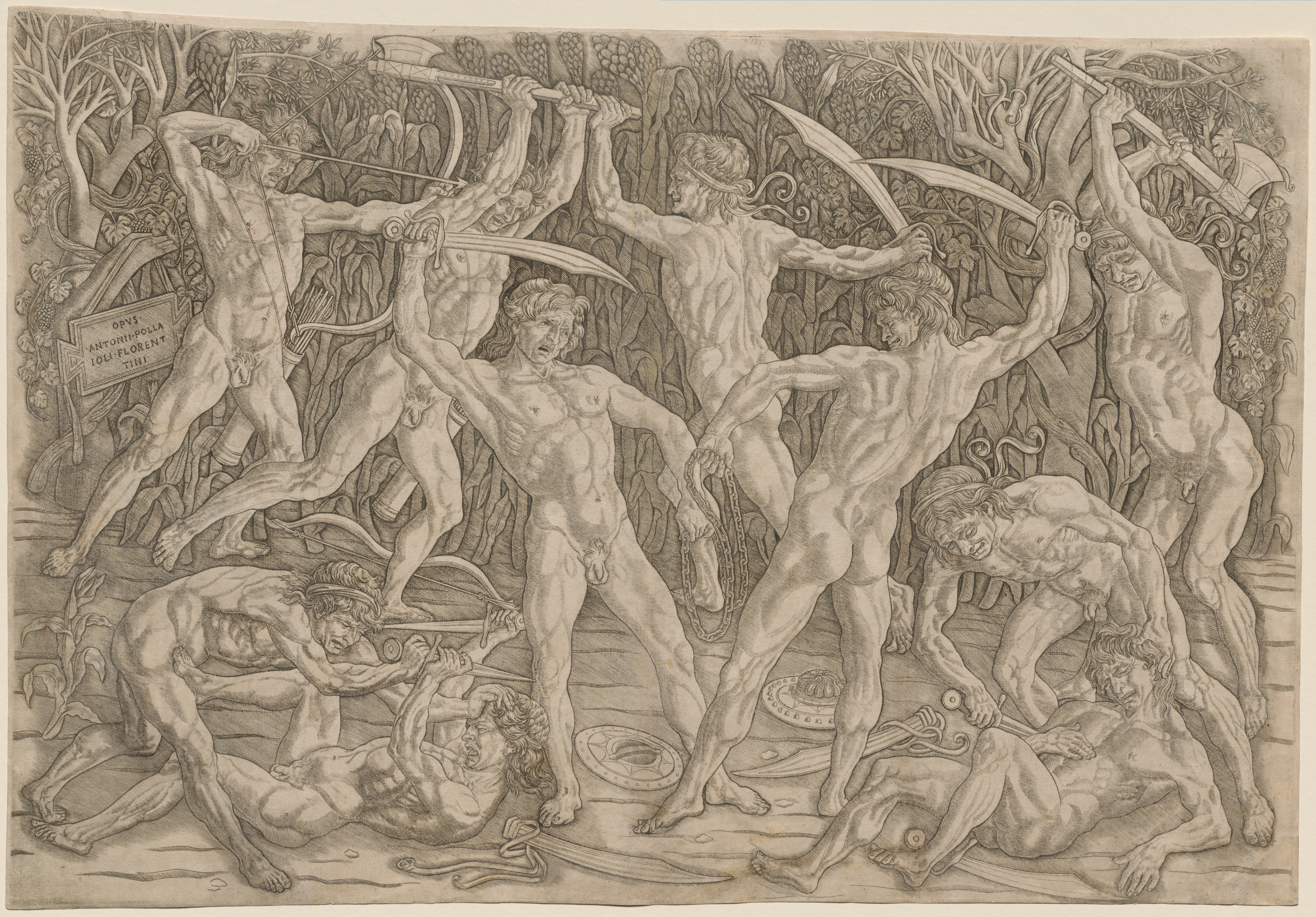
Antonio del Pollaiuolo, Battle of the Nudes (1471–1472)

At this time, Florence's most prestigious botteghe were those of Verrocchio and the Pollaiuolo brothers, whose most renowned member was Antonio, active in sculpture, painting and graphic arts. For Lorenzo de' Medici, he created the bronze statuette Hercules and Antaeus (c. 1475), in which the mythological motif is represented by a play of interlocking broken lines, generating tensions of great violence.

Pollaiuolo's research into human anatomy enabled him to achieve a realistic representation of movement, struggle and tension, resulting in clean, limpid forms, even in the smallest details. His main characteristic is the strong, vibrant contour line that gives the figures a dynamic tension that seems capable of bursting at any moment. This effect can be seen in the panel of Hercules Slaying Antaeus (c. 1475) in the Uffizi, in the Dancing Nudes fresco in Villa La Gallina, or in the engraving of the Battle of the Nudes (1471–1472).

The Pollaiuolo brothers were among the first to use an oil base in both the preparation of the wood supports and the execution of the colours, achieving a brilliance reminiscent of Flemish works.

=== Andrea del Verrocchio ===
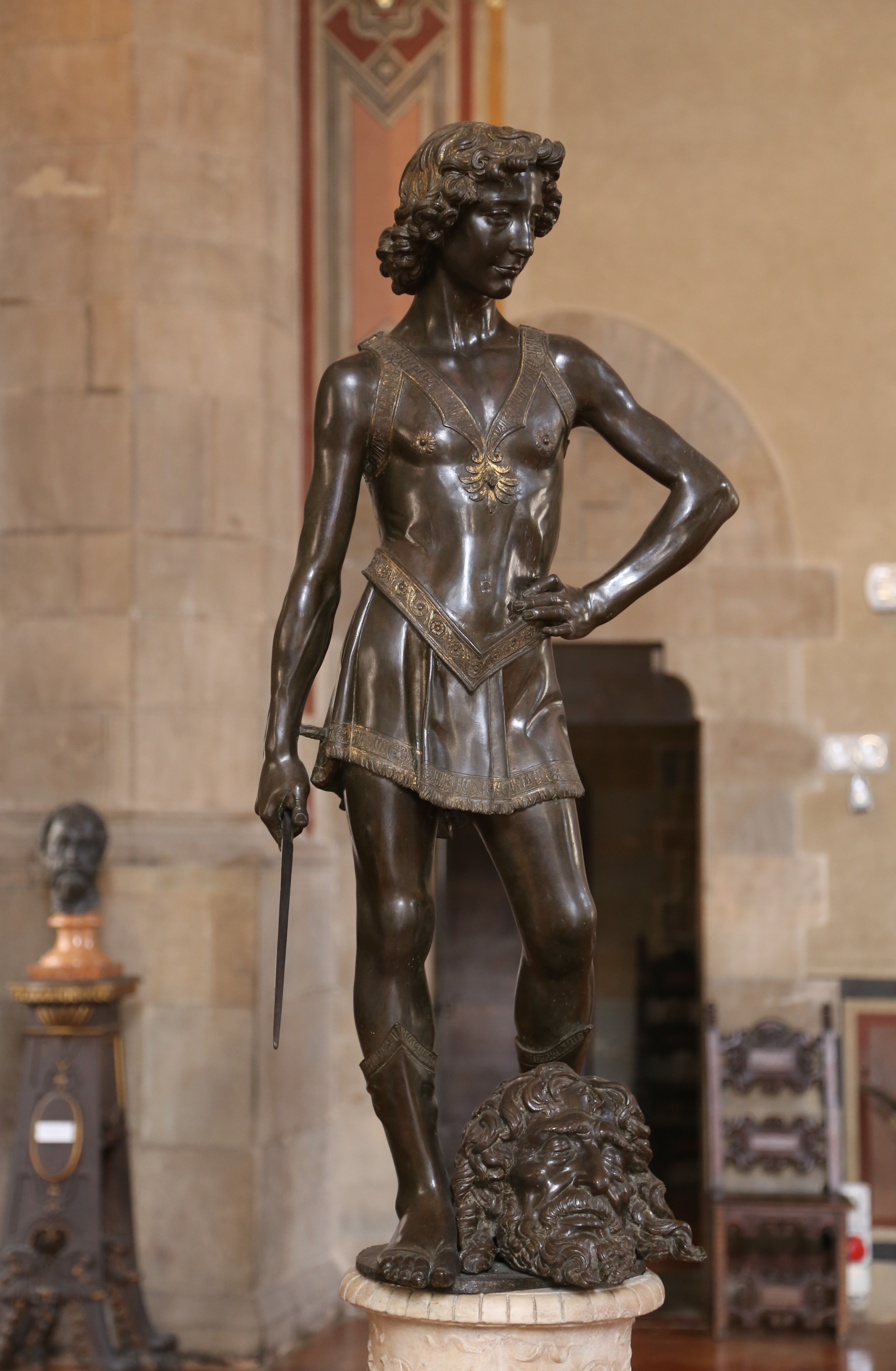
Verrocchio, David.

Andrea del Verrocchio, a versatile artist skilled in drawing, goldsmithing, painting and sculpture, was inclined towards naturalism and rich ornamentation. During the 1470s, he produced elegant works that gradually became monumental, such as David, a theme taken up by other illustrious artists, to which he applied "courtly" canons, in the effigy of a daring, elusive youth revealing unprecedented psychological expressions. The space, which is occupied in a complex manner, solicits various points of view on the part of the spectator. The soft modelling, anatomical precision and psychology of the figure probably influenced Verrocchio's pupil Leonardo da Vinci.

During the 1470s, Verrocchio's versatile workshop was one of the most sought after in Florence, a melting pot for new talents such as Leonardo da Vinci, Sandro Botticelli, Perugino, Lorenzo di Credi and Domenico Ghirlandaio.

=== Sandro Botticelli – formation and maturity ===
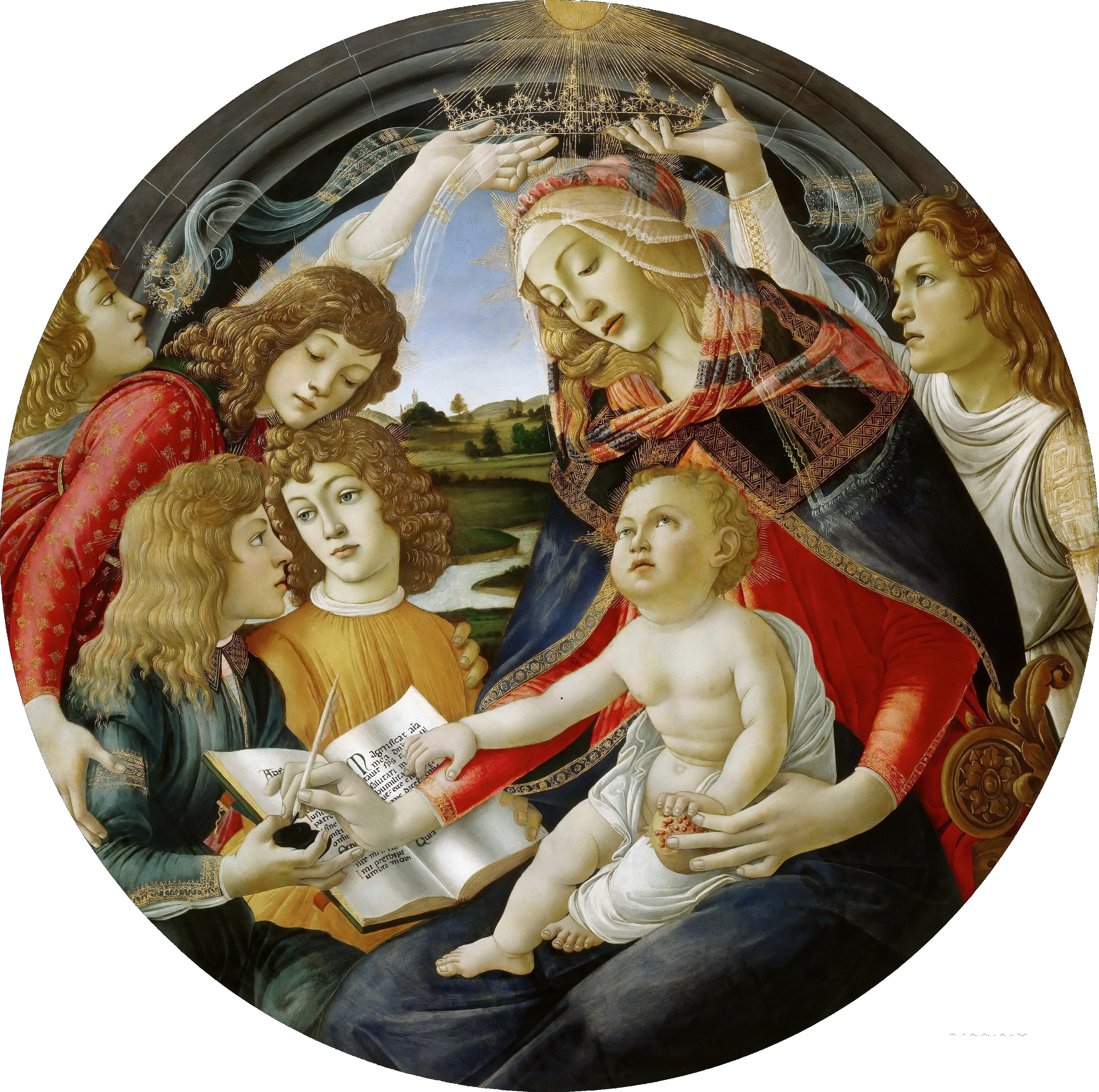
Botticelli, Madonna of the Magnificat (c. 1483–1485)

Sandro Botticelli was closely associated with the Medici court and its ideal of harmony and beauty. Already in his first dated work, Fortitude (1470), he demonstrates his dexterity in the refined use of colour and chiaroscuro derived from his first master, Filippo Lippi, but animated by a greater solidity and monumentality, in the manner of Verrocchio, with a linear tension learned from Antonio del Pollaiuolo. Botticelli's style is a particular result of all these influences, with the figure seemingly placed on the surface rather than seated on the foreshortened throne, animated by a set of lines that dematerialise its appearance. The fundamental characteristic of Botticelli's style is the drawing and evidence of the contour line.

Botticelli's research led him to develop an incisive, "virile" style, with a progressive detachment from the natural. In the Madonna of the Magnificat (c. 1483–1485), for example, he experimented with optics, with figures that appear as if reflected in a convex mirror, and whose dimensions are greater than those at the centre, thus moving away from the rational, geometric space of the early Quattrocento.

Primavera (c. 1478) is probably his most important work, perfectly in tune with "Laurentian" ideals in which myth reflects moral truths and modern style inspired by Antiquity. Spatiality is barely hinted at, with the scene set in front of a shady copse where nine figures are arranged in a semi-circle. The figure of Venus in the centre represents the axis, with two symmetrical groups on the sides, with rhythms and pauses reminiscent of a musical undulation. The dominant motif is the linear cadence, linked to the metrical aspect, as in the very fine veils of the Graces, with their supple volumes and the search for a type of ideal, universal beauty. The same considerations apply to The Birth of Venus (c. 1485), probably through the Primavera.

The first symptoms of a crisis were already apparent in Florence with the death of Lorenzo the Magnificent and the establishment of Savonarola's republic. This gradual shift was already evident in the work of other artists such as Filippino Lippi.

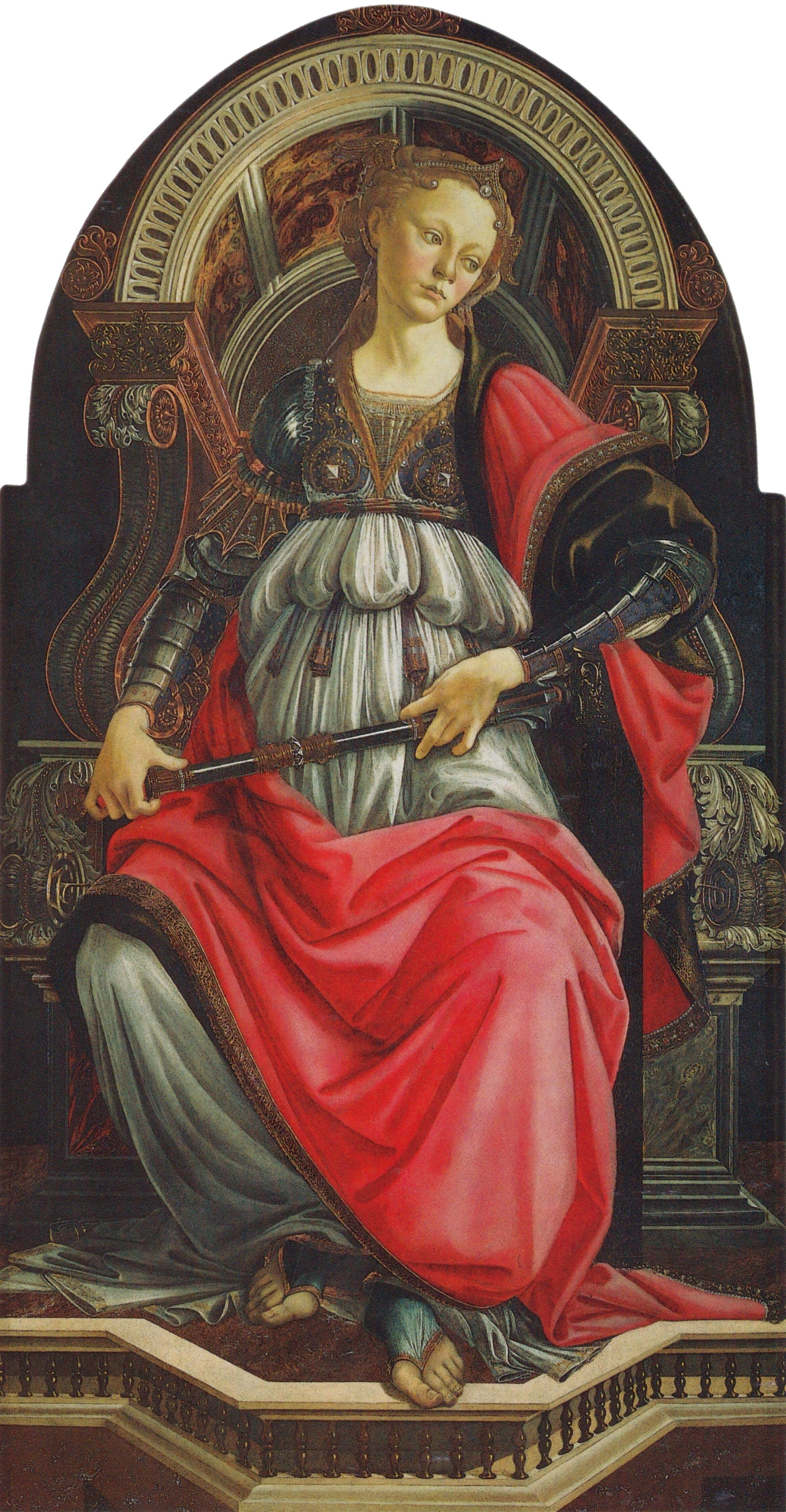
Botticelli, Fortitude (1470)

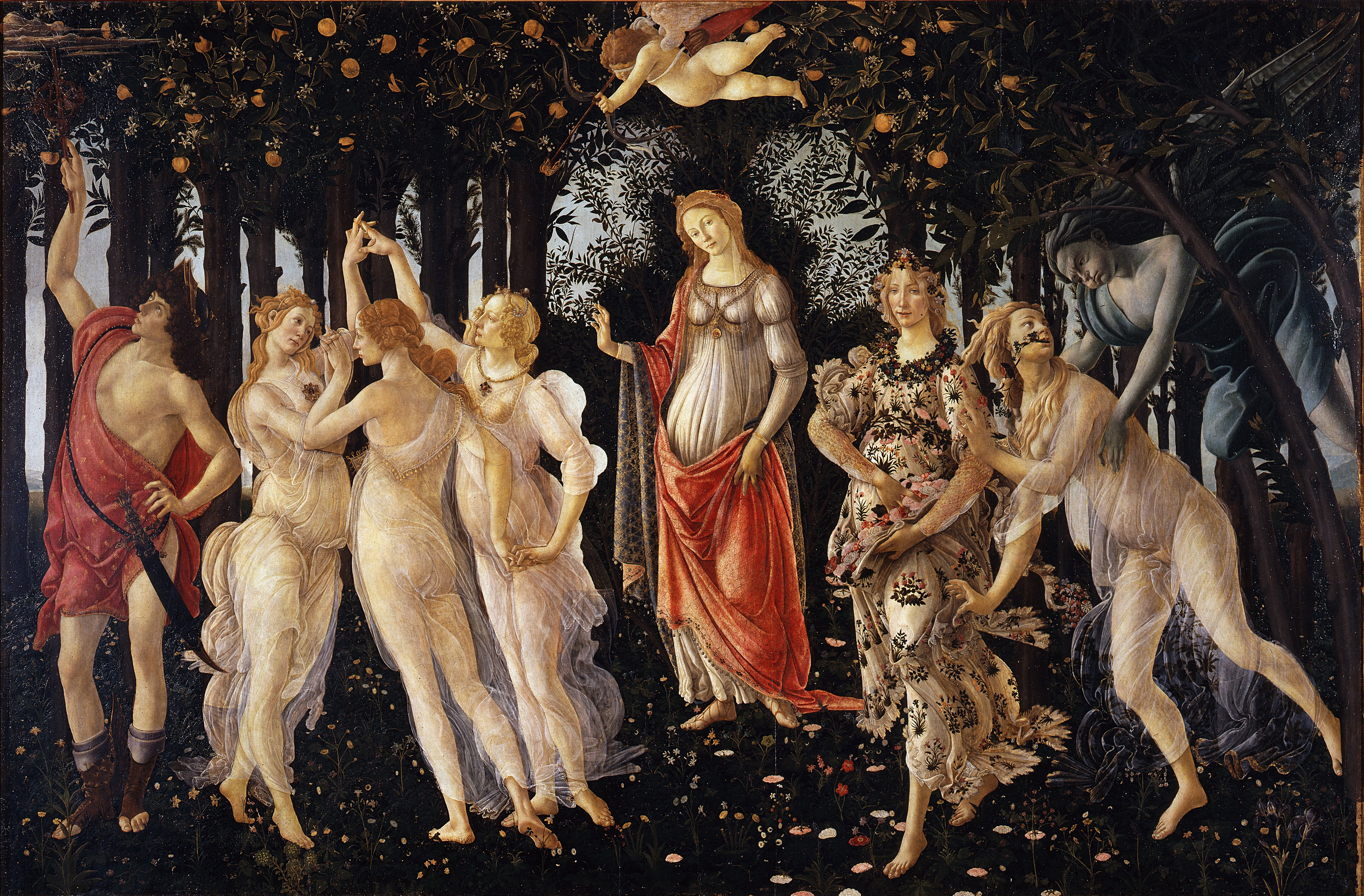
Botticelli, Primavera (c. 1478)

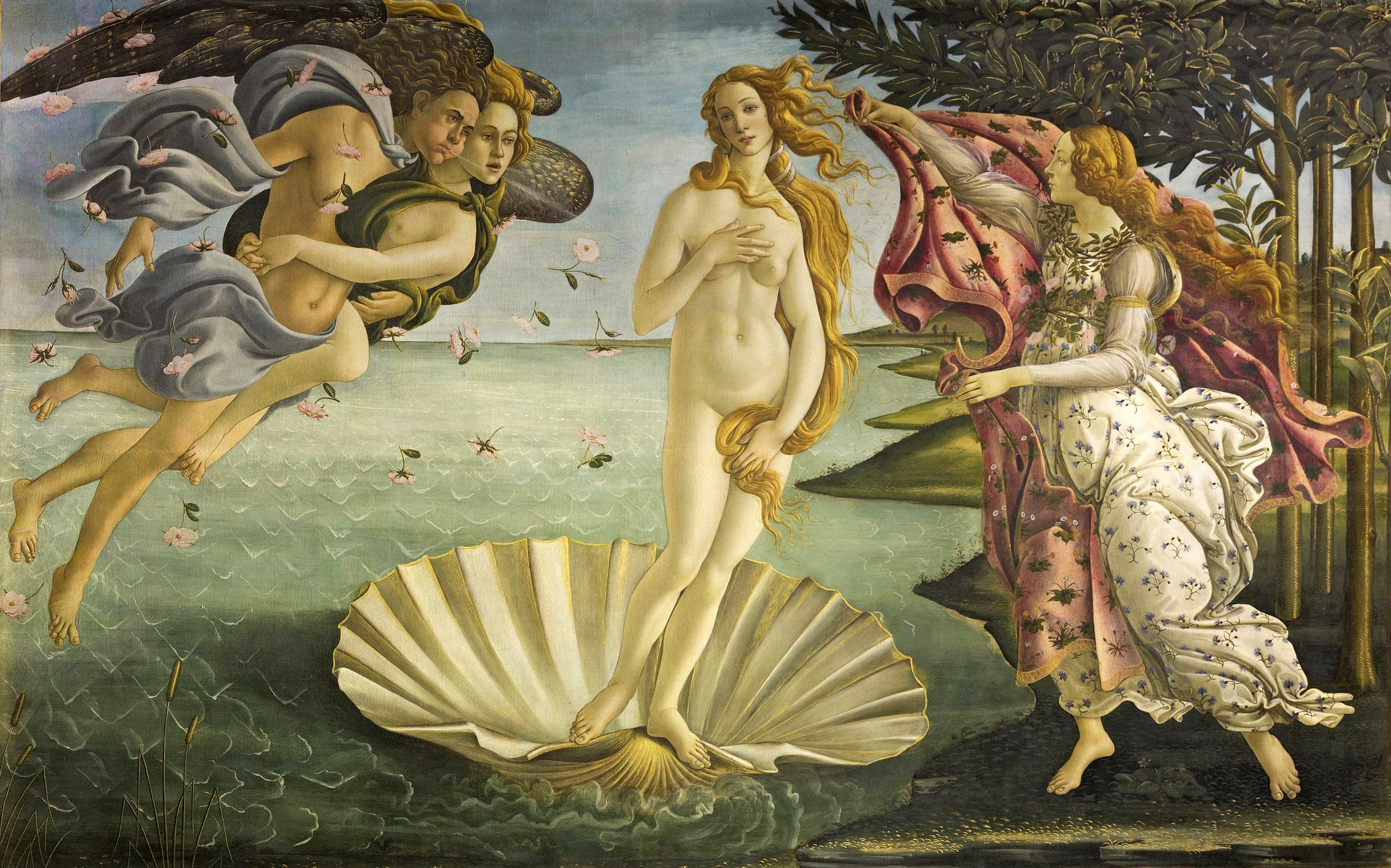
Botticelli, The Birth of Venus (c. 1485)

=== The young Leonardo da Vinci ===
Leonardo, Ginevra de' Benci (c. 1475)

In 1469, Leonardo da Vinci entered Verrocchio's workshop as an apprentice. From the 1470s onwards, he received a series of commissions demonstrating his adherence to the "finito" style, with its meticulous rendering of detail, supple pictorial execution and openness to Flemish influences, such as the Annunciation (c. 1472–1475) and the Madonna of the Carnation (1475–1480). In the latter work, the artist's style is already rapidly maturing towards a greater fusion between the elements of the image, with more sensitive and fluid passages of light and chiaroscuro; indeed, the Virgin emerges from a room in semi-darkness, in contrast to a distant, fantastic landscape that appears through two windows in the background.

The rapid maturation of Leonardo's style brought him into confrontation with his master. In the past, a series of sculptures by Verrocchio have been attributed to the young Leonardo, such as Verrocchio's Dama col mazzolino (1475–1480), in which the tender rendering of the marble seems to evoke the atmospheric effects of Leonardo's pictorial works such as the Portrait of Ginevra de' Benci (c. 1475). The similarities between these two works can also be seen at iconographic level, if we consider that Leonardo's painting was originally larger in size, with the presence of the hands in the lower part, of which a study of hands on paper remains in the Royal Collection at Windsor Castle.

The Baptism of Christ (1475–1478), a collaborative work between the two artists, marks the closest point of contact; however, in 1482 Leonardo's Florentine experience came to an end when, having begun the Adoration of the Magi, he distanced himself from the artists called to work on the Sistine Chapel and moved to Milan.

=== Domenico Ghirlandaio ===
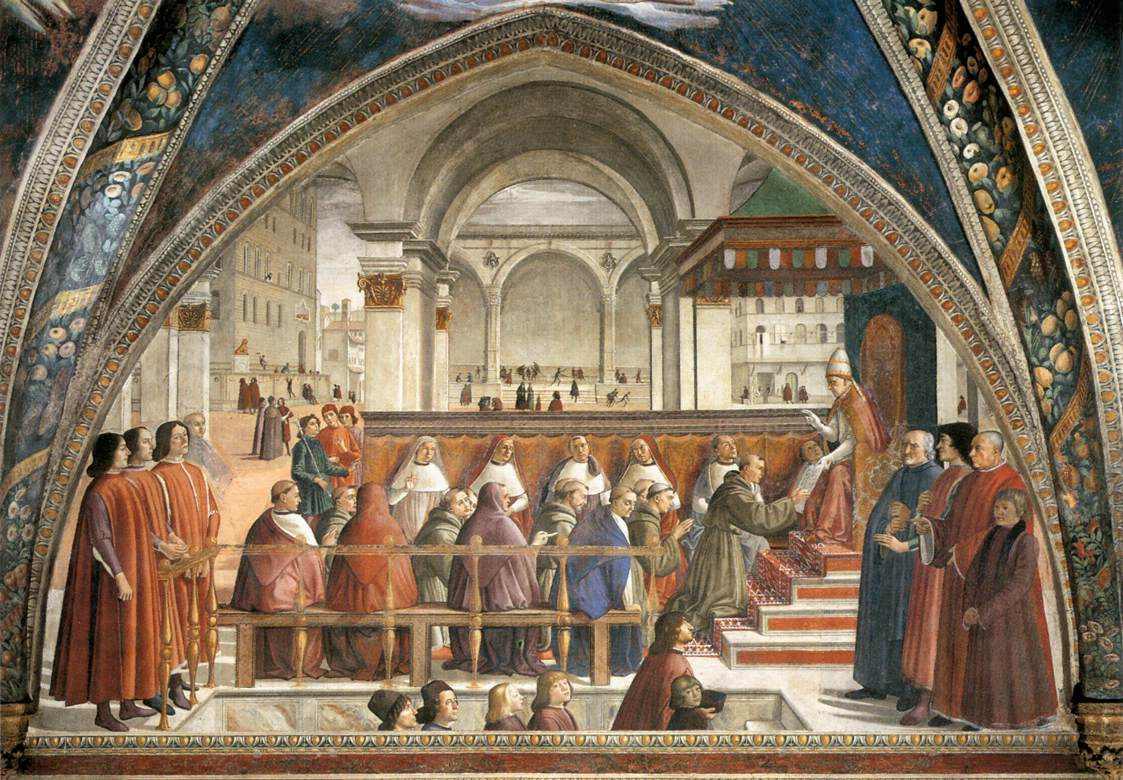
Domenico Ghirlandaio, Confirmation of the Franciscan Rule, Sassetti Chapel, Santa Trinita (1482–1485)

Along with Sandro Botticelli, Cosimo Rosselli and Perugino, Domenico Ghirlandaio was one of the members of the mission ambasceria artistica set up by Lorenzo de' Medici to reconcile with Pope Sixtus IV. He was sent to Rome to decorate the Sistine Chapel.

Domenico Ghirlandaio trained first in the workshop of Alesso Baldovinetti, where he came into contact with Flemish art, whose style remained a constant throughout his career, and then probably with Verrocchio.

To this specificity, from his earliest works he added an attraction for serene, balanced compositions and for the creation of highly expressive portraits from a physiognomic and psychological point of view. On his return from Rome, he enriched his repertoire with reproductions of ancient monuments. All these characteristics, combined with his ability to organise an efficient workshop with his brothers, made him the main artist in demand by Florentine high society clients during the 1480s. From 1482, he worked on the Stories of Saint Francis in the Sassetti Chapel in Santa Trinita, and from 1485 on the Tornabuoni Chapel in Santa Maria Novella.

His talent for storytelling and the clarity and attractiveness of his language were the keys to his success. His audience was not to be found in Neoplatonist intellectual circles, but among the upper-middle class, more accustomed to trade and banking than to ancient literature and philosophy, eager to see themselves portrayed as participating in sacred stories, and little inclined to the frivolities and anxieties that ran through the minds of painters like Botticelli and Filippino Lippi.

== Savonarola's crisis ==
On the death of King Ferdinand I of Naples in 1494, Charles VIII of France assumed the title of King of Naples and Jerusalem and entered Italy. This marked the start of the first Italian War (1494–1497). The fragile political system of the Italian "signorie" was shaken, leading to the first wave of instability. In Florence, a popular uprising drove out Piero de' Medici, son of Lorenzo, establishing a new republic spiritually guided by the preacher and Dominican friar Girolamo Savonarola. In 1496, Savonarola openly condemned Neoplatonic and humanist doctrines, urging a vigorous reform of ascetic practices and customs. The exaltation of man and beauty was rejected, as was all production and collecting of "profane art", leading to the Bonfire of the Vanities. On 23 May 1497, Savonarola was excommunicated by Pope Alexander VI, and in 1498 the Pope accused him of heresy, prophetism, sedition and religious error; he was burned in the Piazza della Signoria on 23 May 1498. This execution reinforced the spiritual misguidance and social crisis that would forever undermine the humanist certainty which was the foundation of the early Renaissance.

These tragic events had consequences for artistic production, both in terms of new demands from patrons who were followers of Savonarola and for the religious crisis and new spiritual orientation of certain artists such as Fra Bartolomeo, Michelangelo and Botticelli, who, after meeting Savonarola, no longer painted female nudes.

=== Late Botticelli ===
Sandro Botticelli's last works are all characterised by religious fervour, and reflect a rethinking of the principles that had guided the artist's previous activity. The return to early Quattrocento modes highlights the abandonment of traditional figurative systems.

The turning point is clearly evident in the allegorical work Calumny of Apelles (1496). The work purports to recreate a lost painting by the Greek painter Apelles, which was created to defend himself from an unjust accusation described by Lucian of Samosata. In a monumental loggia, an evil judge sits on the throne advised by Ignorance and Suspicion; in front of him is Rancour, the ragged man holding Slander by the arm, a beautiful, richly dressed woman being groomed by Seduction and Deceit. Calumny drags the helpless "slandered" across the ground with one hand, and with the other clutches a flameless torch symbolising false knowledge. The old lady on the left is Remorse, and the last female figure is Nuda Veritas (Naked Truth), whose gaze turned skyward indicates the only source of Justice. The dense decoration of the architectural elements and the frenzy of the figures accentuate the dramatic sense of the painting. The whole recreates a kind of "tribunal of history", in which the accusation seems directed against the ancient world, whose absence of justice, one of the fundamental values of civil life, is bitterly observed.

Examples of stylistic regression are the Altarpiece of San Marco (1488–1490), with its archaic gilded background, and The Mystical Nativity (1501), where spatial distances become confused, proportions are dictated by chosen hierarchies and the expressive poses, often accentuated, end up appearing unnatural.

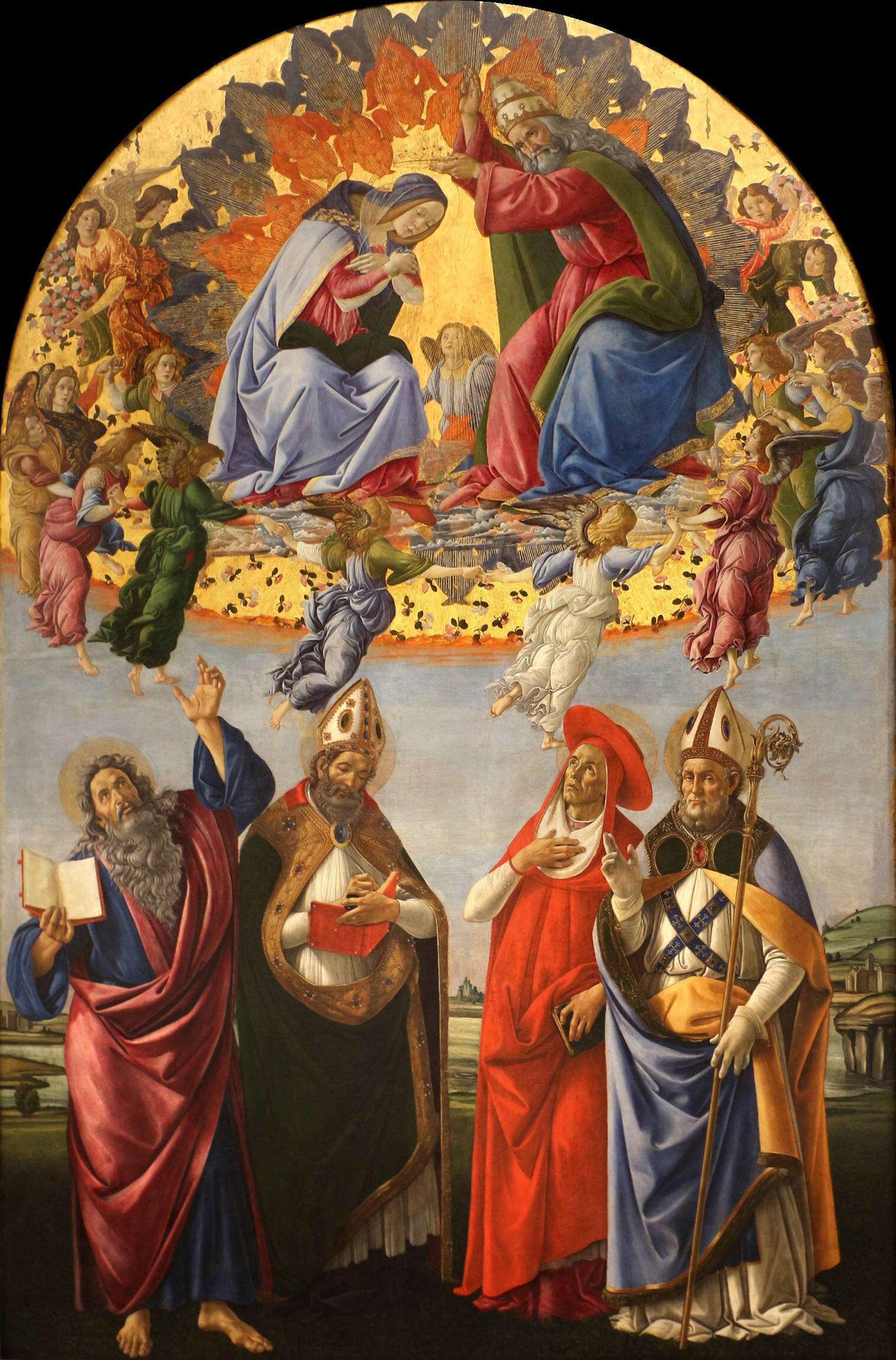
Botticelli, Altarpiece of San Marco (1488–1492)

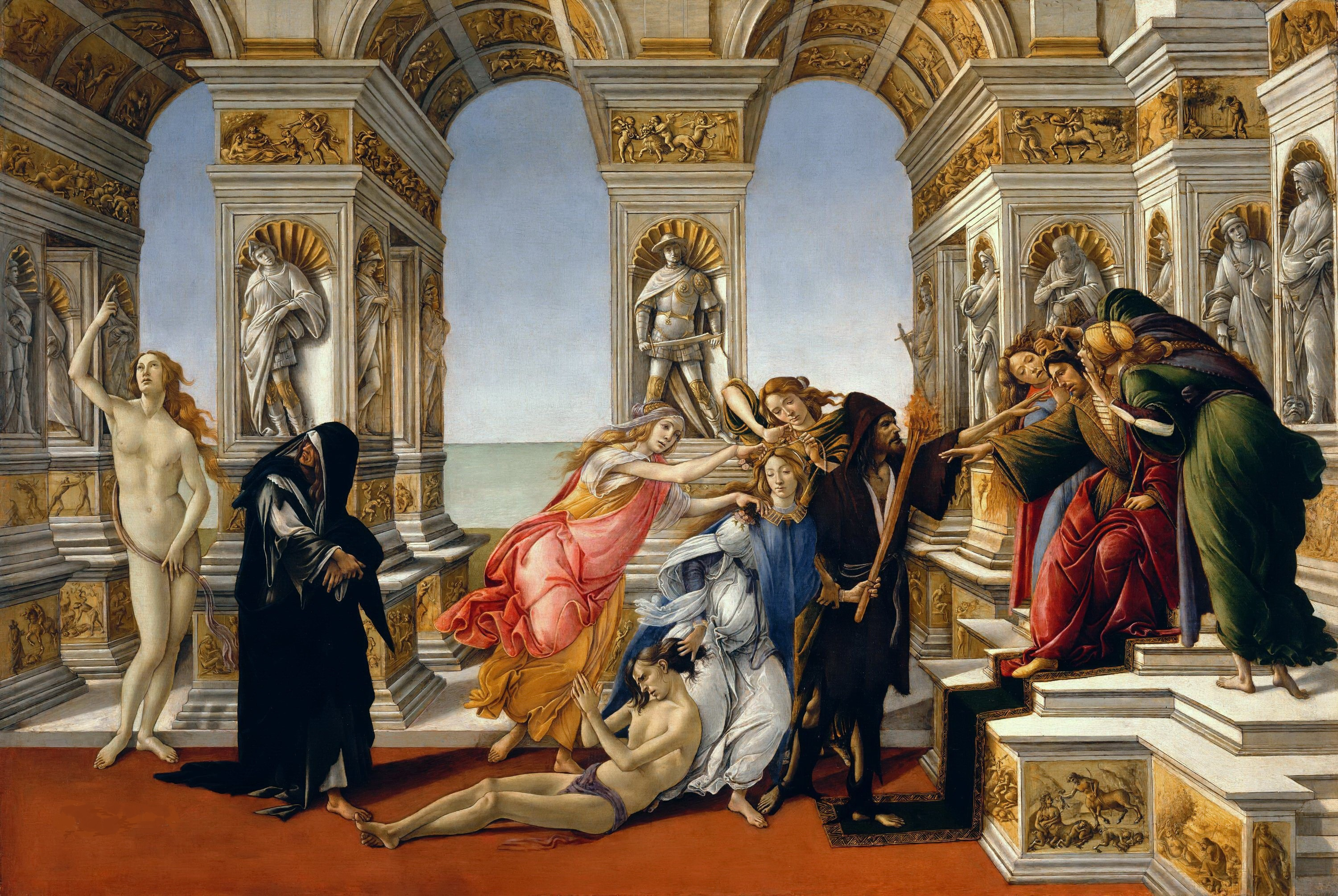
Botticelli, Calumny of Apelles (1496)

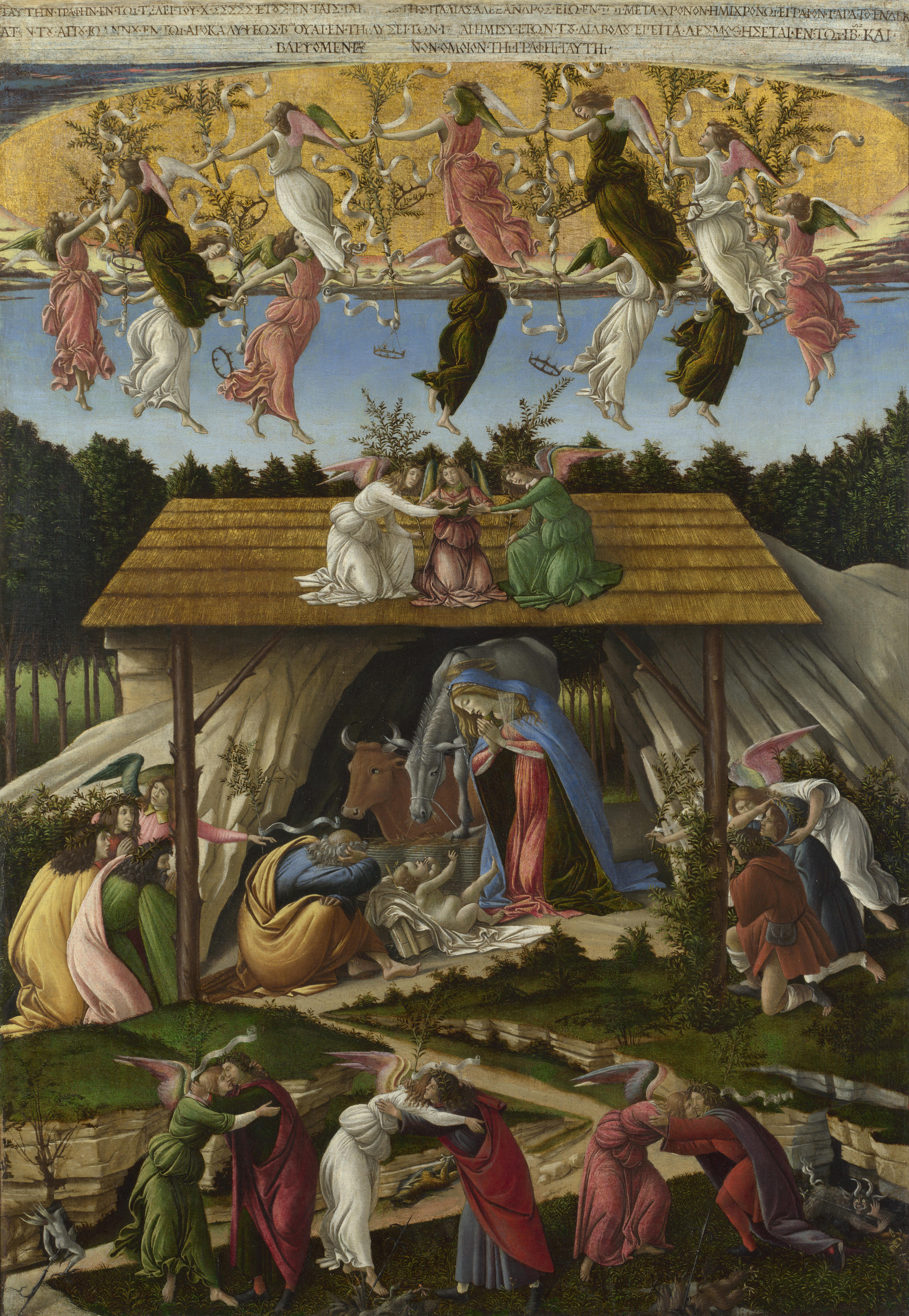
Botticelli, The Mystical Nativity (1501)

=== Filippino Lippi ===
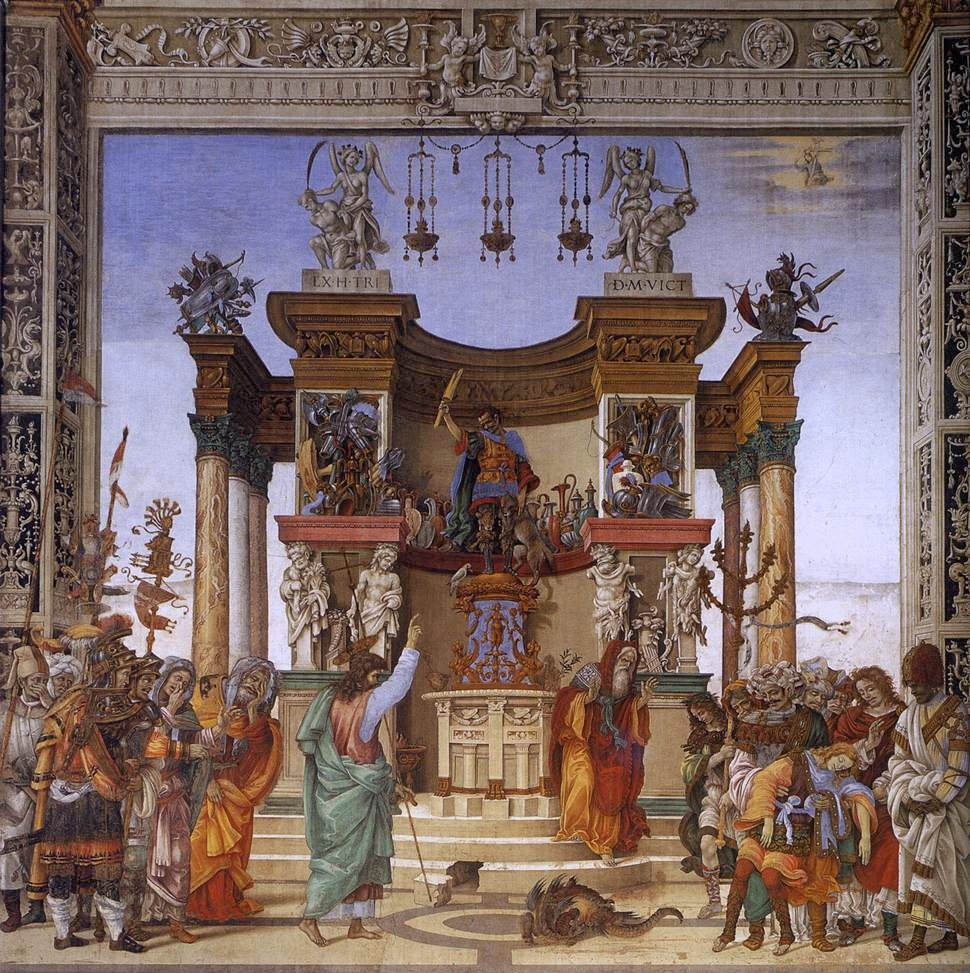
Filippino Lippi, Saint Philip Driving the Dragon from the Temple of Hierapolis, Filippo Strozzi Chapel at Santa Maria Novella (1487–1502)

Filippino Lippi, son of Fra Filippo Lippi, was one of the first artists to express a sense of unease in his style. Probably present in the Sistine Chapel alongside Botticelli during his stay, he enriched his repertoire with archaeological references, inspired by a desire to commemorate the ancient world.

Filippino Lippi was influenced by the Savonarola period and the debate between two parties, one in favour of the monk (the Piagnoni) and the other in favour of the Medici (the Palleschi). During these years, the choice belonged to the party chosen by the patron. So, alongside flamboyant productions for the aristocracy, we also find austere works inspired by Savonarola's preaching. Filippino Lippi worked for both parties. Intense mysticism can be seen in the pair of panels of Saint John the Baptist and Mary Magdalene at the Galleria dell'Accademia in Florence.

Filippino Lippi set his figures in a landscape that recreates the ancient world down to the smallest detail, showing the influence of the grottesco style he had seen on his trip to Rome. It is in the frescoes of the Carafa Chapel that we can detect what was to become the signature characteristic of Filippino's style: Botticellian elegance and simplicity is complicated by the introduction of ever more detail and fantastic architecture, "where he deploys astonishing archaeological splendour". In this way, he creates an "animation", mysterious and fantastic, but his disturbing style also shows unreality in a kind of nightmare. He depicts deformed, merciless executioners with dark faces who threaten the saints. In the scene of Saint Philip Driving the Dragon out of Hierapolis, the statue of the pagan god Mars is a menacing figure who seems to challenge the Christian saint.

=== The young Michelangelo ===
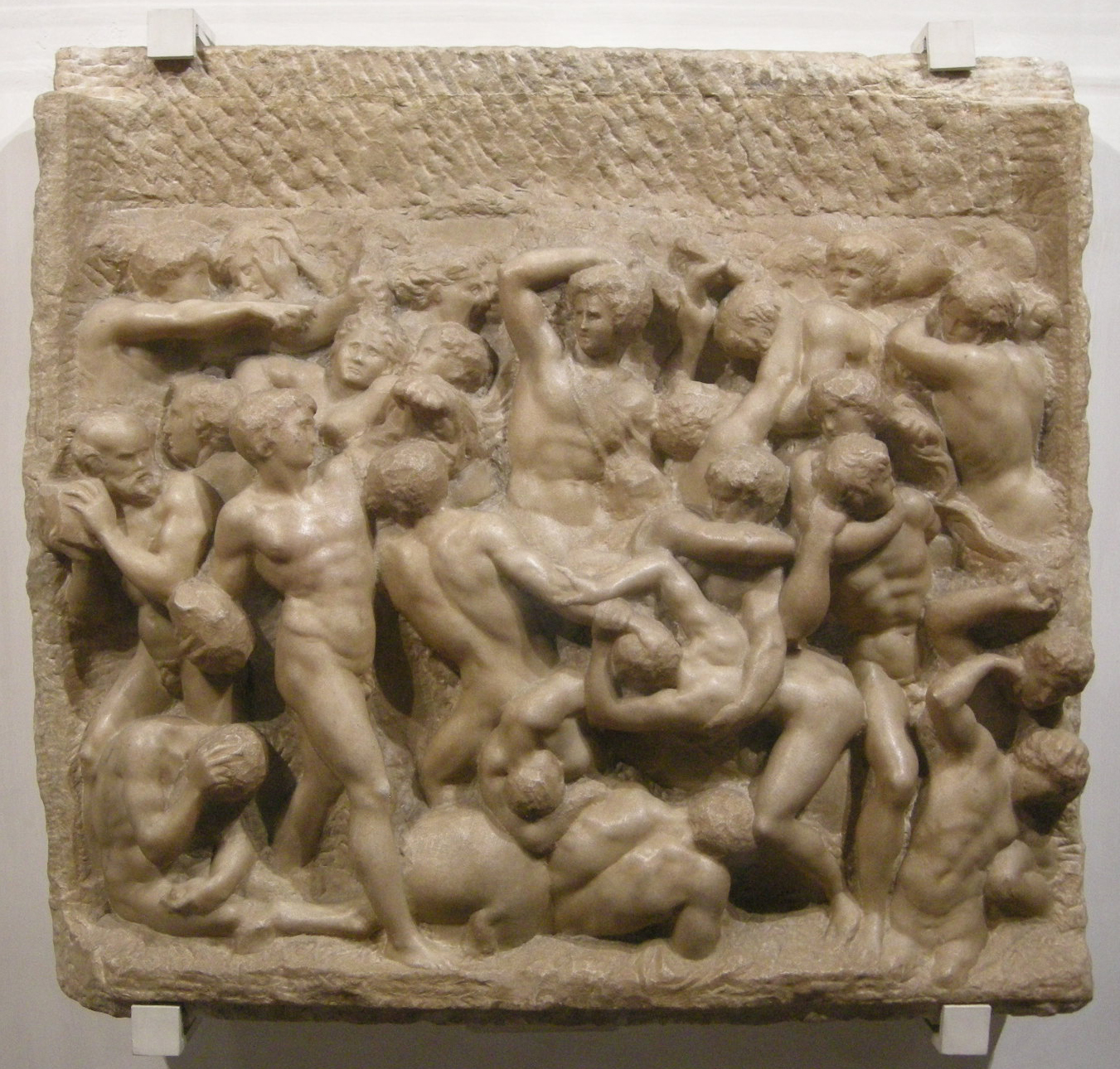
Michelangelo, Battle of the Centaurs (c. 1492)

Michelangelo Buonarroti entered the workshop of the brothers Daniele and Domenico Ghirlandaio (Note: The Ghirlandaio brothers enjoyed a solid and prestigious reputation.) (Note: Michelangelo began his artistic training at the age of thirteen. His apprenticeship lasted three years in the Florentine workshop.) as a very young apprentice, copying masters such as Giotto at the Peruzzi Chapel in Santa Croce and Masaccio at the Brancacci Chapel. Already in these early works, he shows a facility for assimilating the fundamental stylistic elements of the masters, particularly regarding plastic and monumental aspects.

Under the protection of Lorenzo de' Medici, Michelangelo studied the classical models available to the Medici in the garden of the San Marco convent, where the artist became aware of the indissoluble unity between the images of myths and the passions that animated them, rapidly becoming capable of reviving the classical style without being a passive interpreter copying a repertoire. The Battle of the Centaurs (c. 1492) is a case in point. The tumultuous movement and strong contrast recall Roman sarcophagi and the bas-reliefs of Giovanni Pisano, and the lost Sleeping Cupid, presented as a classical work and which deceived Cardinal Raffaele Riario in Rome, who, once his anger had passed after the discovery of the deception, wanted to meet the artist by bringing him to Rome, where he produced his first masterpieces.

But alongside these lively, vigorous works, Michelangelo demonstrates an ability to adopt a variety of languages, as in the more intimate Madonna of the Stairs (1490–1492). Inspired by Donatello's stiacciato, it shows, in addition to a certain virtuosity, the ability to transmit an impression of blocked energy, given by the unusual position of the Virgin and Child, who seem to show their shoulders to the viewer.

In the following years, moved by Savonarola's preaching, Michelangelo abandoned secular subjects and charged his works with psychological and moral meanings.

== Period of "geniuses" ==
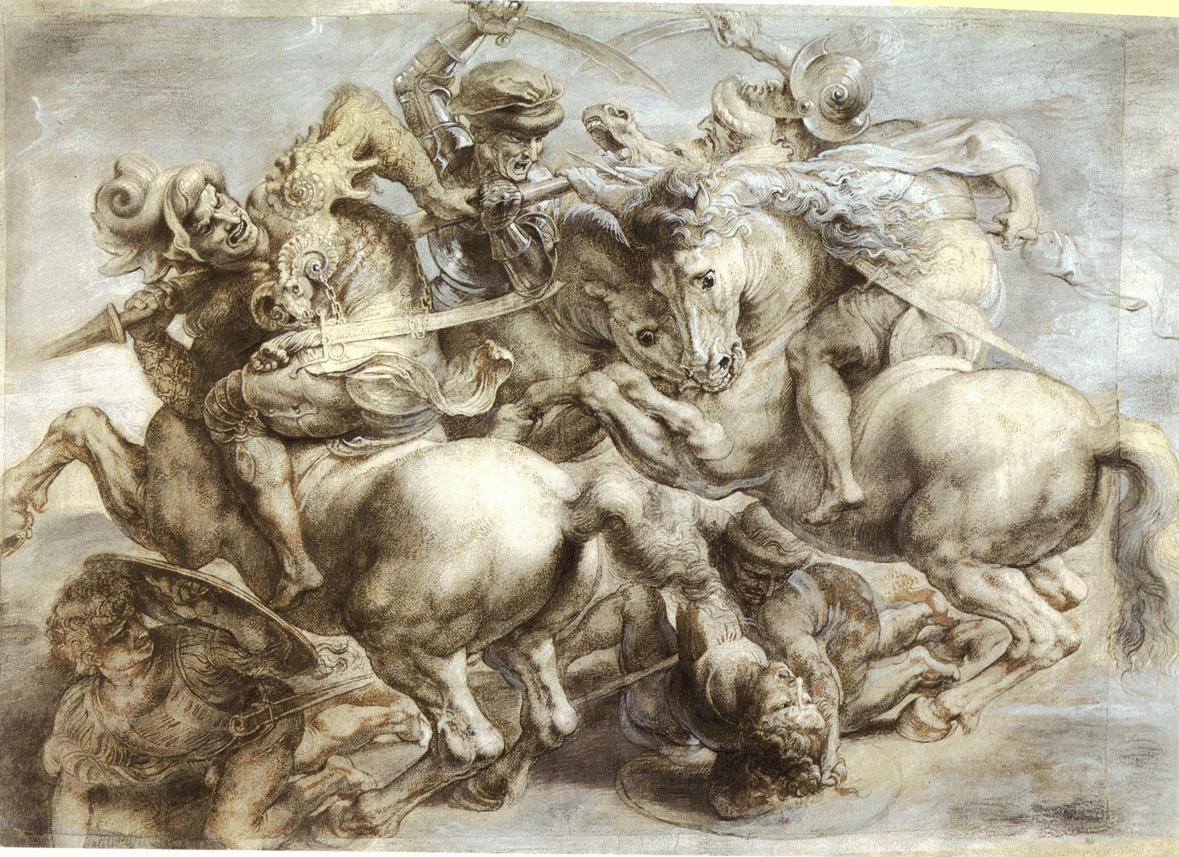
Peter Paul Rubens, copy of The Battle of Aghiari by Leonardo da Vinci

Leonardo, Mona Lisa

The last period of the Florentine Republic, during which Piero Soderini held the post of gonfaloniere for life, although politically insignificant, marked an astonishing revival in artistic production, favouring a resumption of both public and private commissions. Great artists were recalled to Florence to enhance the prestige of the new republic, generating a rapid and consistent artistic renewal. The main players in this period were Leonardo da Vinci and Michelangelo, who returned to the city after stays in other artistic centres, and Raphael, who returned to the city to keep informed of new developments.

=== Leonardo's return and departure ===
Leonardo returned to Florence shortly before August 1500, after the fall of Ludovico Sforza in Milan. A few months later, he exhibited a cartoon with Saint Anne, described by Vasari, in the Basilica of Santissima Annunziata:

Finalmente fece un cartone dentrovi una Nostra Donna et una S. Anna, con un Cristo, la quale non pure fece maravigliare tutti gl’artefici, ma finita ch’ella fu, nella stanza durarono due giorni d’andare a vederla gl’uomini e le donne, i giovani et i vecchi, come si va a le feste solenni, per veder le maraviglie di Lionardo, che fecero stupire tutto quel popolo.
— Giorgio Vasari, "Le vite de' più eccellenti pittori, scultori e architettori" (1568), "Vita di Lionardo da Vinci."
Finally Leonardo made a cartoon with the Virgin and a Saint Anne, with a Christ that was not unanimously admired by art lovers, but once the work was finished, men and women, young and old, flocked into the room for two days to see it, as they do to solemn festivals, to see Leonardo's marvels that dazzled all these people.

It now seems to be accepted that this is not the cartoon of The Virgin and Child with Saint Anne and Saint John the Baptist in the National Gallery, London, but rather a preparatory cartoon for The Virgin and Child with Saint Anne in the Louvre, a painting which was completed much later. Both works are nevertheless faithful to the cartoon exhibited at Santissima Annunziata. In the London cartoon, the figures are tightly packed into a single block and articulated in a rich interweaving of gestures and glances, with fluid modelling of pleats and drapery; very close together in the foreground, the figures are monumental and grandiose as in Leonardo's Last Supper in Milan, while the sfumato generates a delicate balance in the alternation of light and shadow. The emotional component is powerful, especially at the point of strength of Saint Anne's gaze turned towards the Virgin. The painting in the Louvre is more supple and natural, with elegant attitudes and a deep rocky landscape linked to the figures by the use of sfumato. Leonardo's example had a strong impact on local artists, revealing a new formal universe that opened up unexplored new horizons in the field of artistic representation.

In 1503, some time before Michelangelo, Leonardo was commissioned to paint a fresco for part of the large walls of the Sala Grande in the Palazzo Vecchio. This was to depict The Battle of Anghiari, a victorious feat of arms for Florence intended as a "counterpart" to Michelangelo's Battle of Cascina.

For this work, Leonardo experimented with a new technique, inspired by the encaustic painting technique described by Pliny the Elder in his Natural History, which would allow him to avoid being impeded by the short time needed to complete the fresco. As had been the case with the Last Supper, this choice proved unsuitable. The size of the painting meant that the fires could not reach a sufficiently high temperature to dry the colours covering the plaster, which then faded or disappeared. In December 1503, the artist interrupted the transfer of the drawing from cartoon to wall, frustrated by this new failure.

Of the extant partial copies of Leonardo's cartoon, one of the best is that by Rubens in the Louvre. The cartoon is lost, and the last traces of the work were probably covered by Vasari's frescoes in 1557. From the preparatory drawings, we can see the marked difference in representation compared to the earlier battle paintings, organised by Leonardo as a staggering whirlwind with an unprecedented wealth of movement and attitudes linked to "bestial madness" (pazzia bestialissima, as the artist called it).

The Mona Lisa, probably a portrait of Lisa del Giocondo, dates from these same years. One of Leonardo's most important works, it is characterised by minute light fades (sfumato), atmospheric perspective of the landscape and the enigmatic smile that has contributed to the development of the myth surrounding the work.

In 1508, the artist returned first to Milan, then in 1516 to the French court, becoming painter to Francis I.

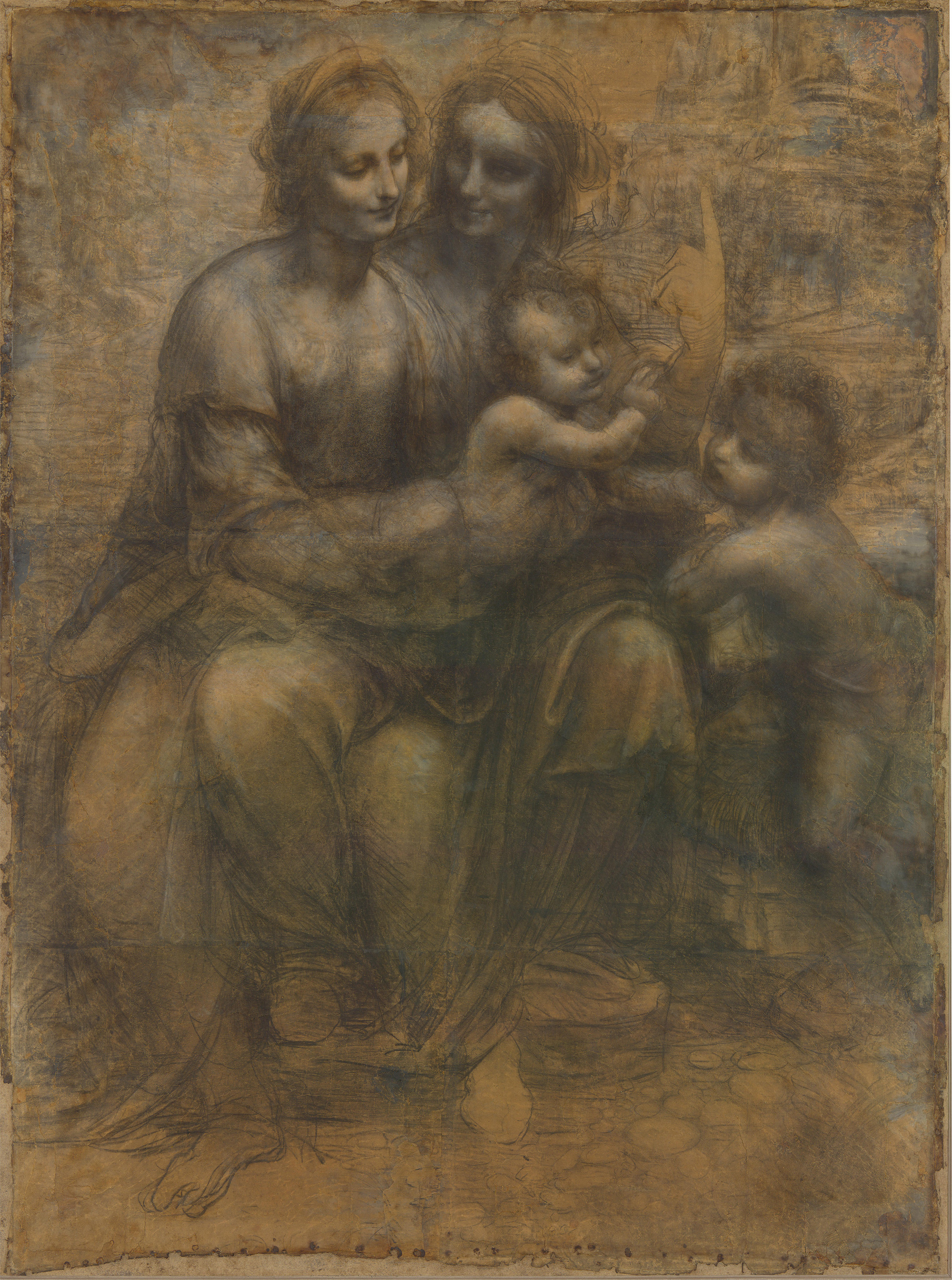
Leonardo, The Virgin and Child with Saint Anne and Saint John the Baptist cartoon

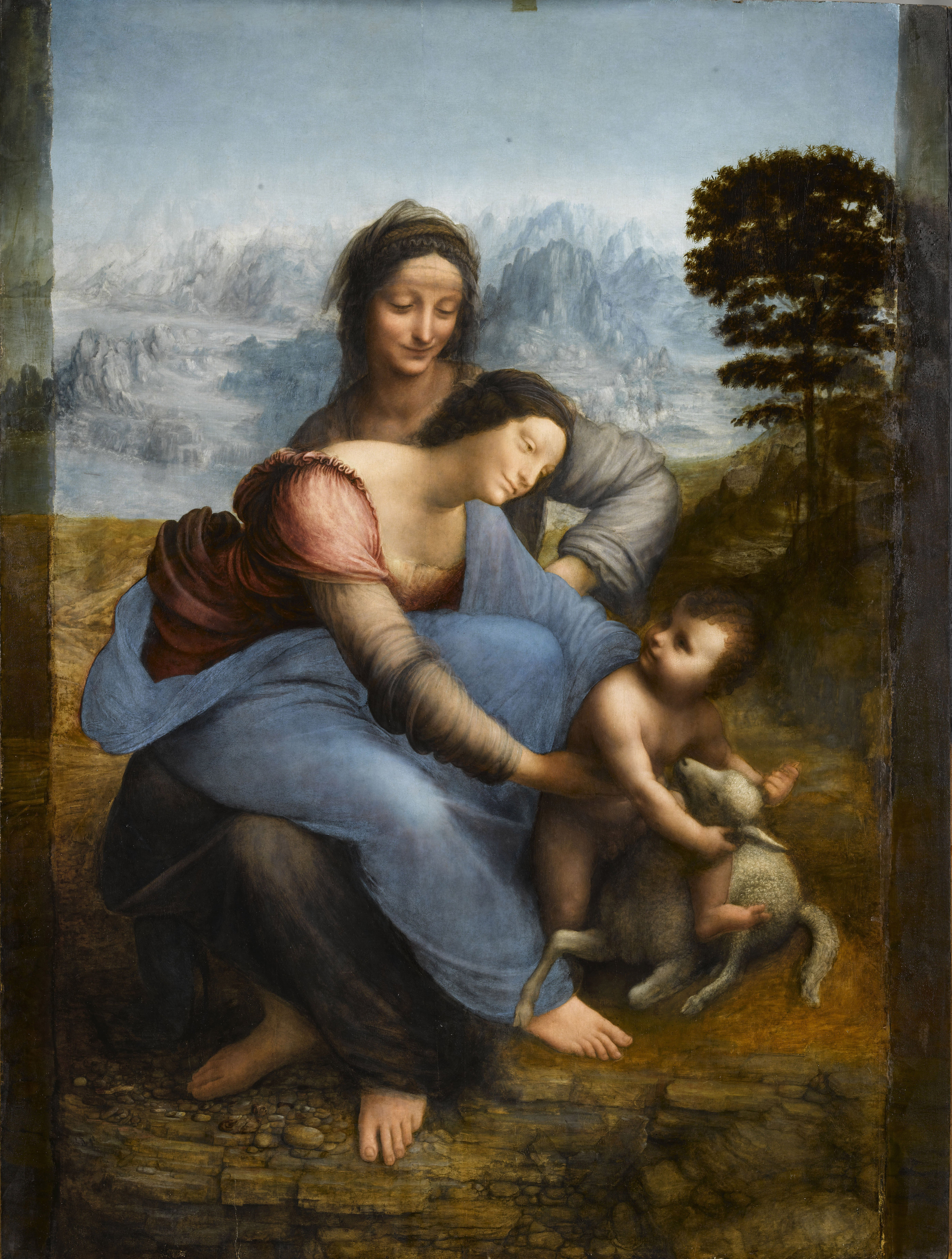
Leonardo, The Virgin and Child with Saint Anne

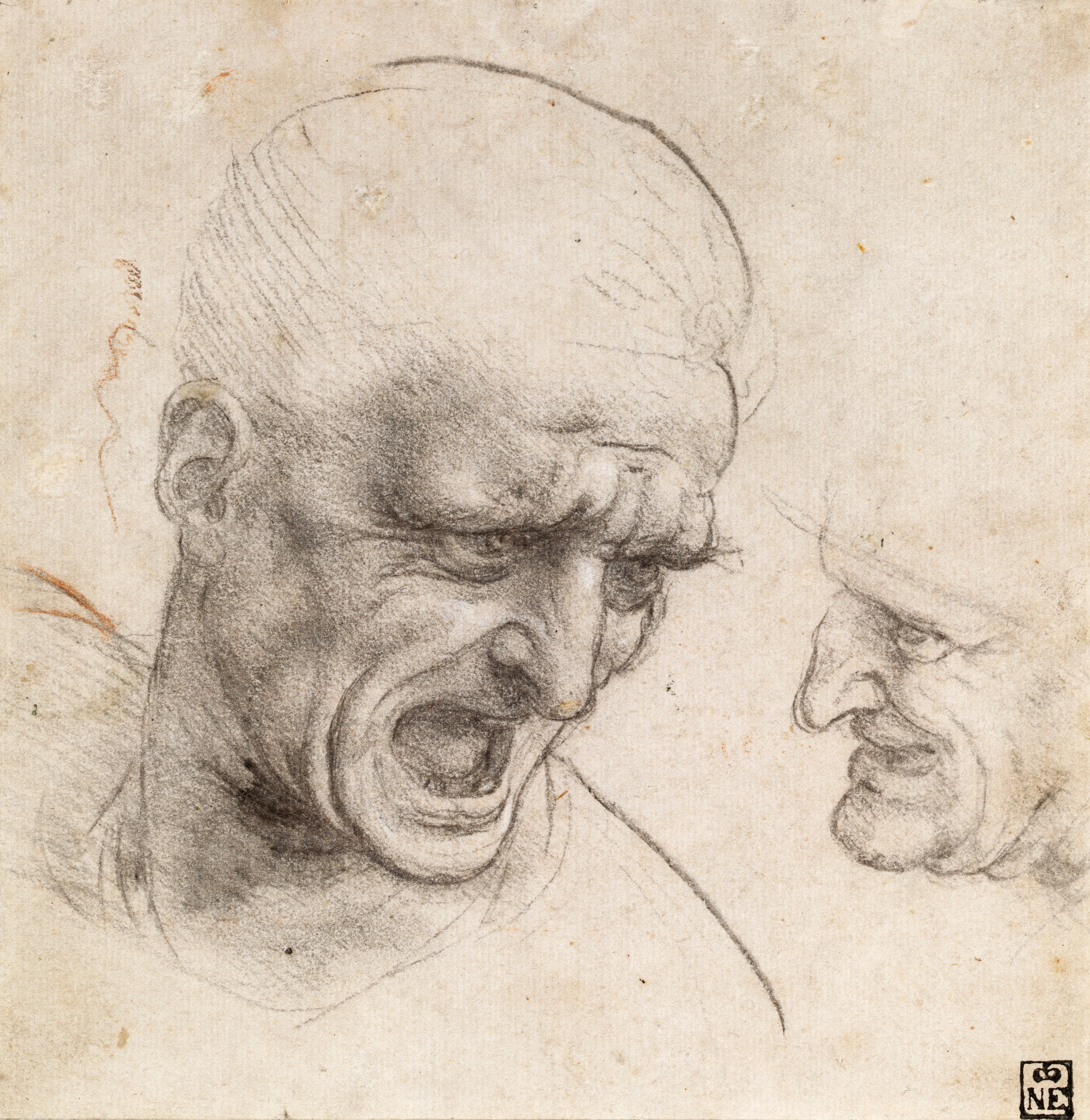
Leonardo, Study of faces for The Battle of Anghiari

=== Return of Michelangelo (1501–1504) ===
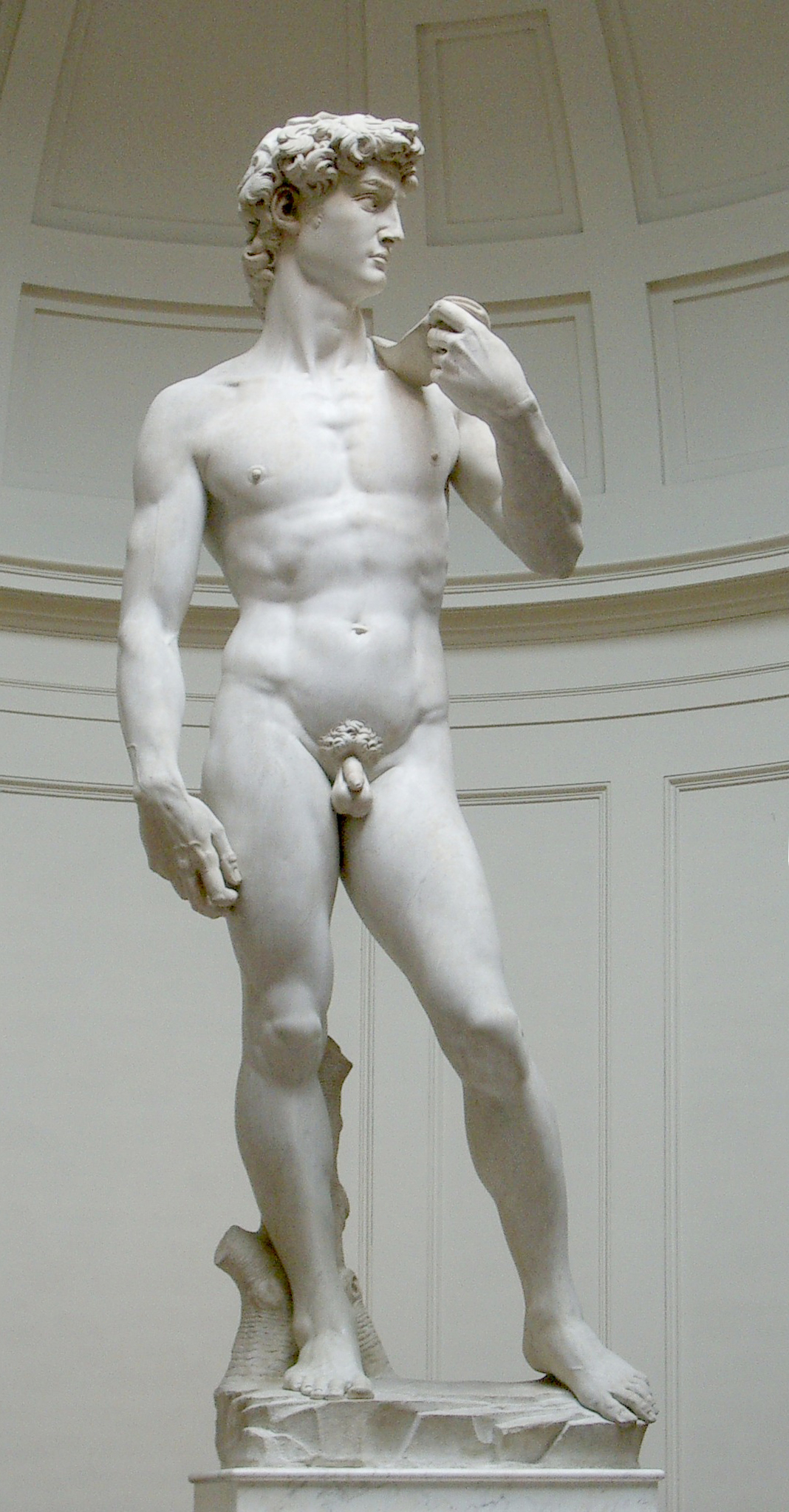
Michelangelo, David

In the spring of 1501, after four years in Rome, Michelangelo also returned to Florence. The consuls of the Arte della Lana and the workers of the Duomo of Florence entrusted him with an enormous block of marble to sculpt a David, an exhilarating challenge on which the artist worked throughout 1503, completing the finishing touches in early 1504. The "colossus", as the sculpture was called at the time, is a triumph of ostentatious anatomical virtuosity, depicting David as a dreamy, already victorious adolescent, a striking departure from the traditional iconography of the athletic biblical hero depicted until then in the prime of life and preparing for battle. The David's limbs are all in tension, and the face is focused, showing maximum concentration, both physical and psychological. The nudity, beauty and sense of domination of the passions in order to defeat the enemy make the David a symbol of the virtue of the Republic, as well as the perfect embodiment of the physical and moral ideal of Renaissance man. The original location on the buttresses of the Duomo was quickly walled up, and the statue was finally placed in front of the Palazzo dei Priori.

The work aroused great enthusiasm, establishing the artist's reputation and securing him a large number of commissions, including a large series of Apostles for the Duomo, of which he only sketched Saint Matthew, a Madonna for a merchant family in Bruges, and a series of sculpted and painted tondi. Michelangelo left suddenly for Rome in March 1505, leaving many projects unfinished.

Michelangelo was influenced by the Saint Anne of Leonardo. Indeed, he took up the theme in a number of drawings, including one in the Ashmolean Museum, in which the circular movement of the group is blocked by deeper, almost sculptural chiaroscuro effects. In the Madonna of Bruges, the cold rigidity of Mary contrasts with the dynamism of the Child, who seems to project himself towards the viewer, taking on symbolic meanings. Their figures are inscribed in an ellipse of great purity and apparent simplicity, exalting their monumentality.

Given the "unfinished" nature of some tondi, such as the Pitti Tondo and the Taddei Tondo, it is difficult to determine whether Michelangelo intended to draw inspiration from Leonardo's atmospheric sfumato. A clear reaction to such a suggestion can be seen in the Doni Tondo, (Note: According to a recent study, the work was executed between 1506 and 1508.) probably painted for the wedding of Agnolo Doni and Maddalena Strozzi. The figures of the Holy Family are linked in a spiral movement, with clearly distinct planes of light and shadow, prominent profiles and intense colours.

From 1504 onwards, Michelangelo worked on a major public commission: the fresco decoration of the Sala Grande with the Battle of Cascina, which was meant to be a counterpart to the work begun by Leonardo. The artist prepared only a cartoon, which was much admired and studied, but was a victim of its own success, first vandalised and then destroyed. The cartoon had become a fundamental model for the study of the human figure in motion, both for local and for visiting artists. Numerous figures were depicted in extremely lively, dynamic attitudes, with many elements borrowed from antiquity, as evidenced by the few copies and variants studied in the preparatory drawings.

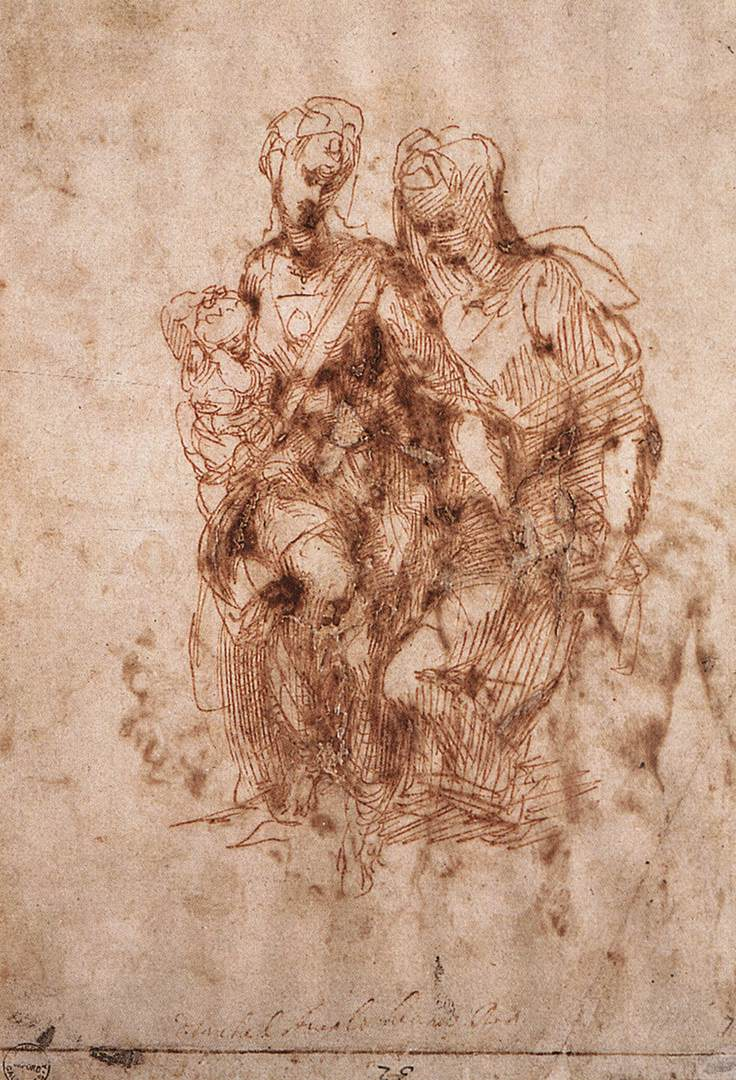
Michelangelo, Study of the Virgin and Child with Saint Anne

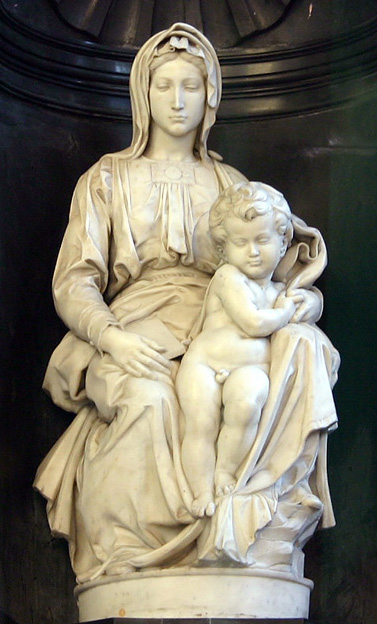
Michelangelo, Madonna of Bruges

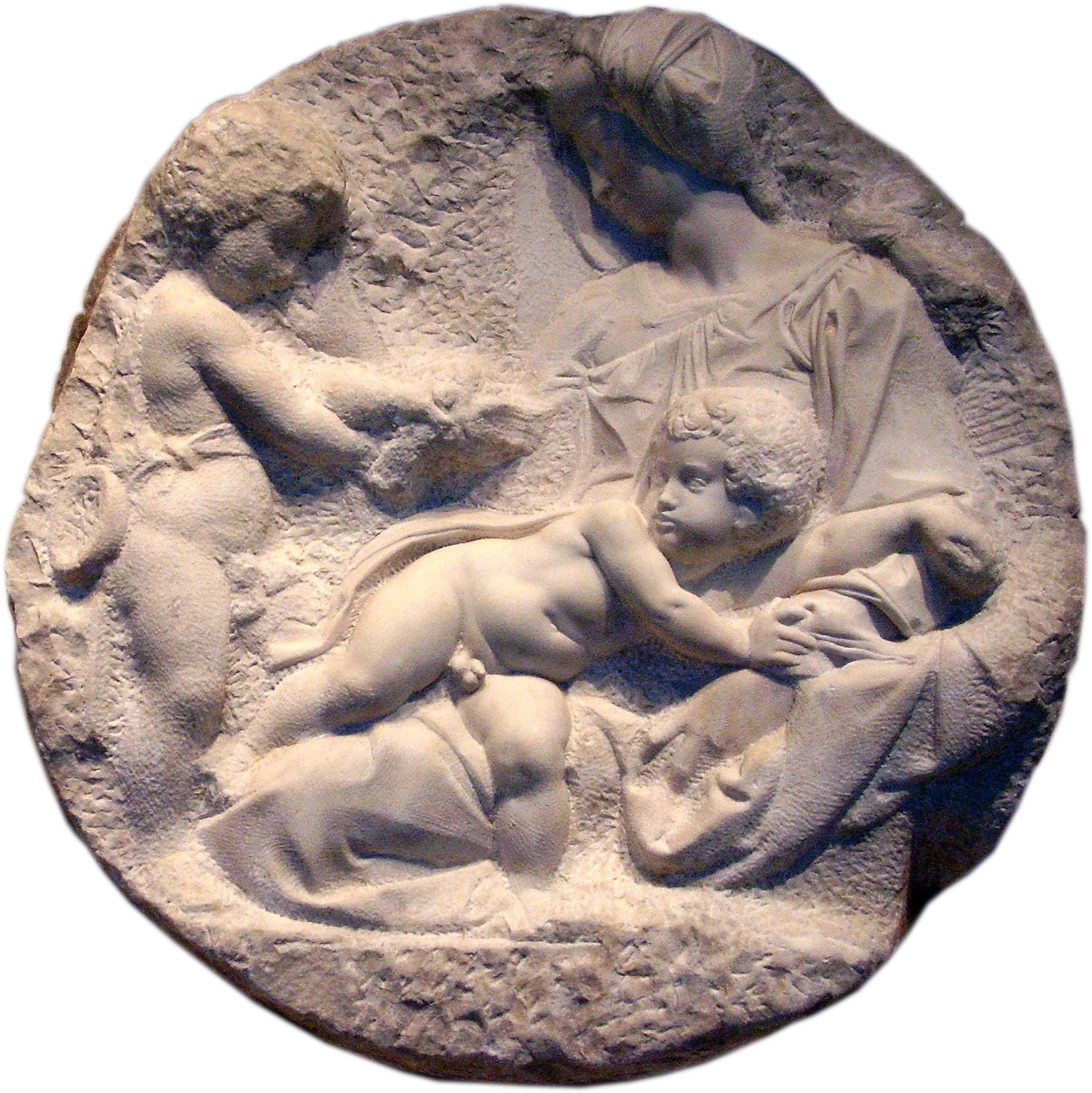
Michelangelo, Taddei Tondo

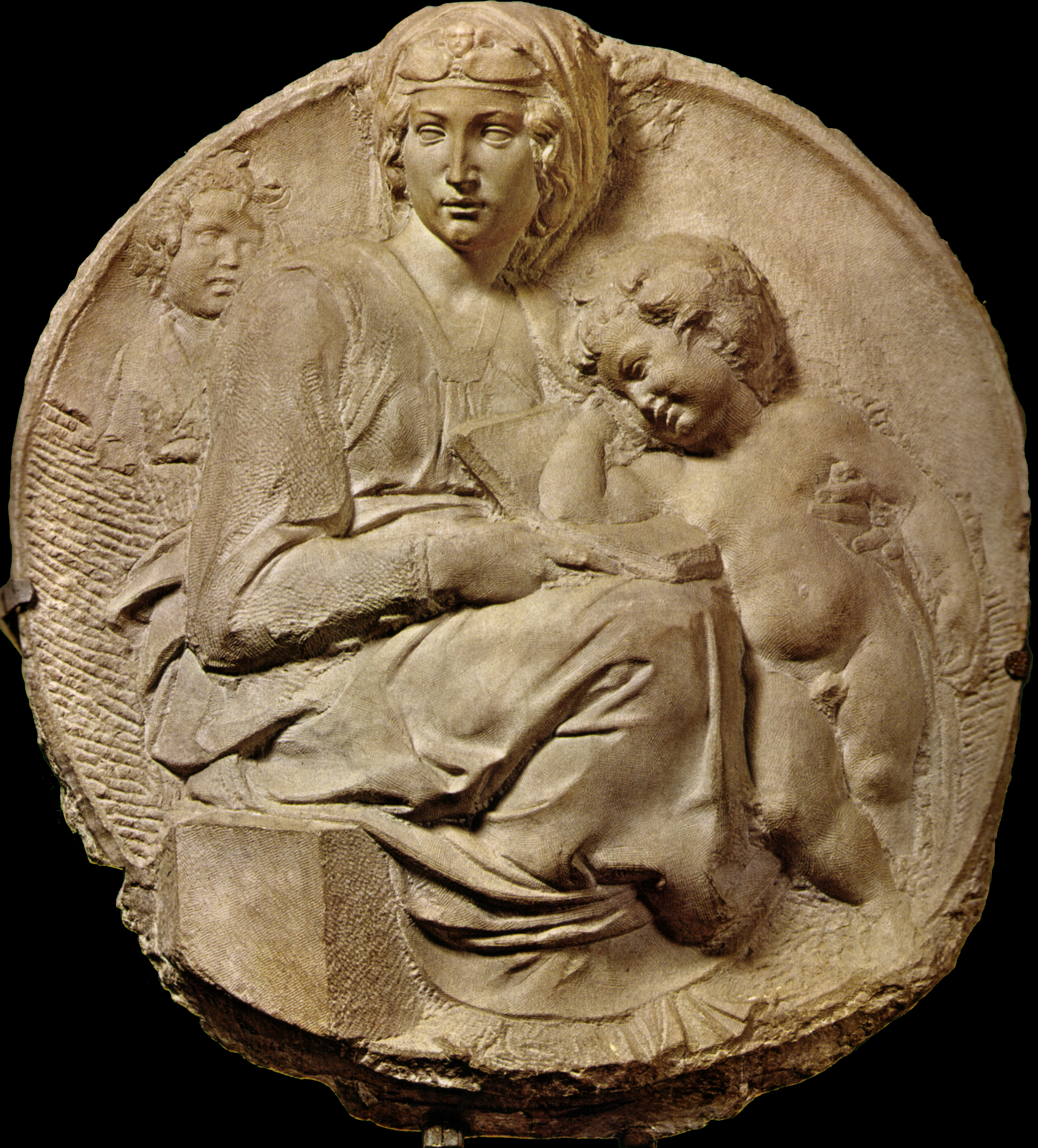
Michelangelo, Pitti Tondo

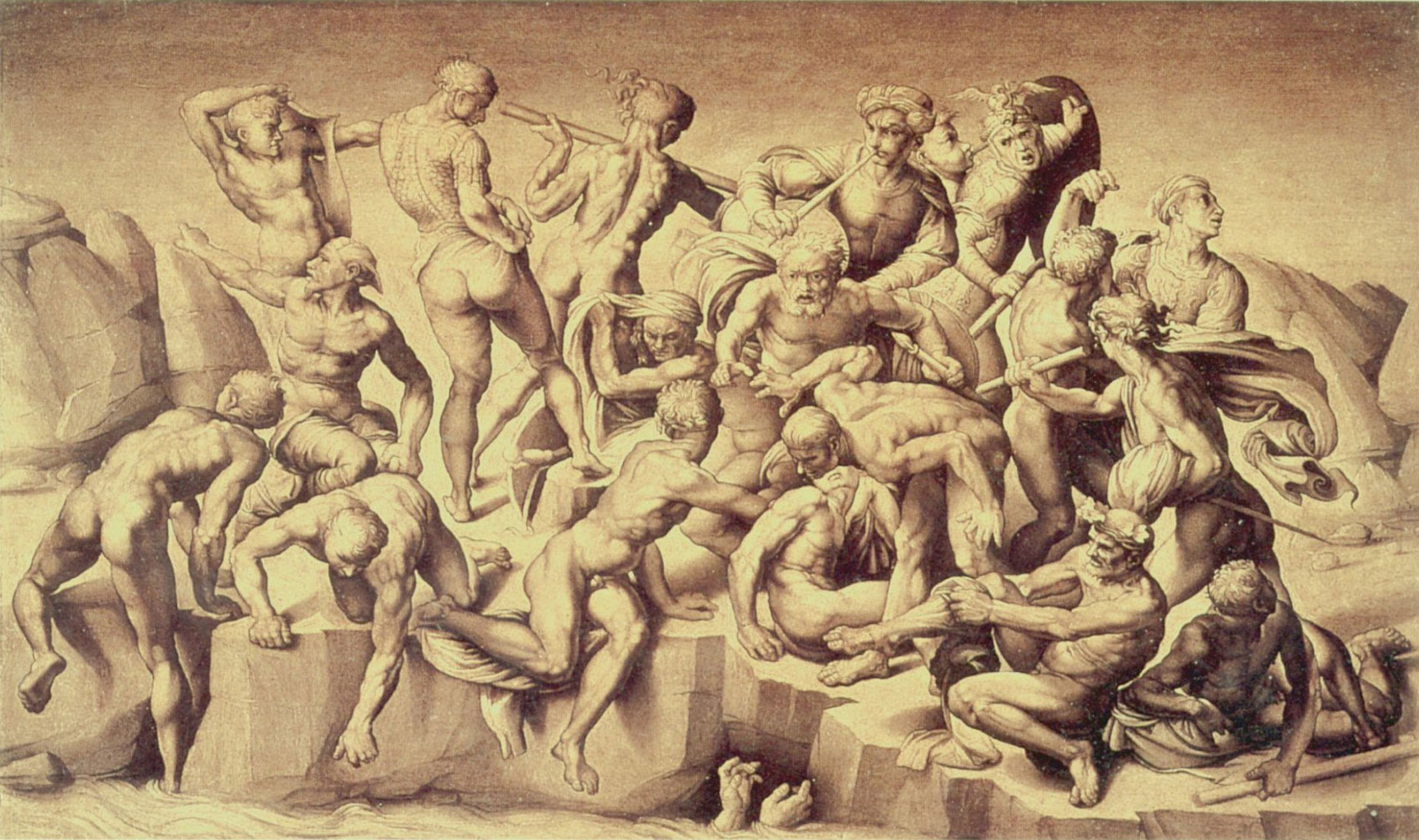
Aristotile da Sangallo, copy of Michelangelo's Battle of Cascina

=== Raphael in Florence (1504–1508) ===
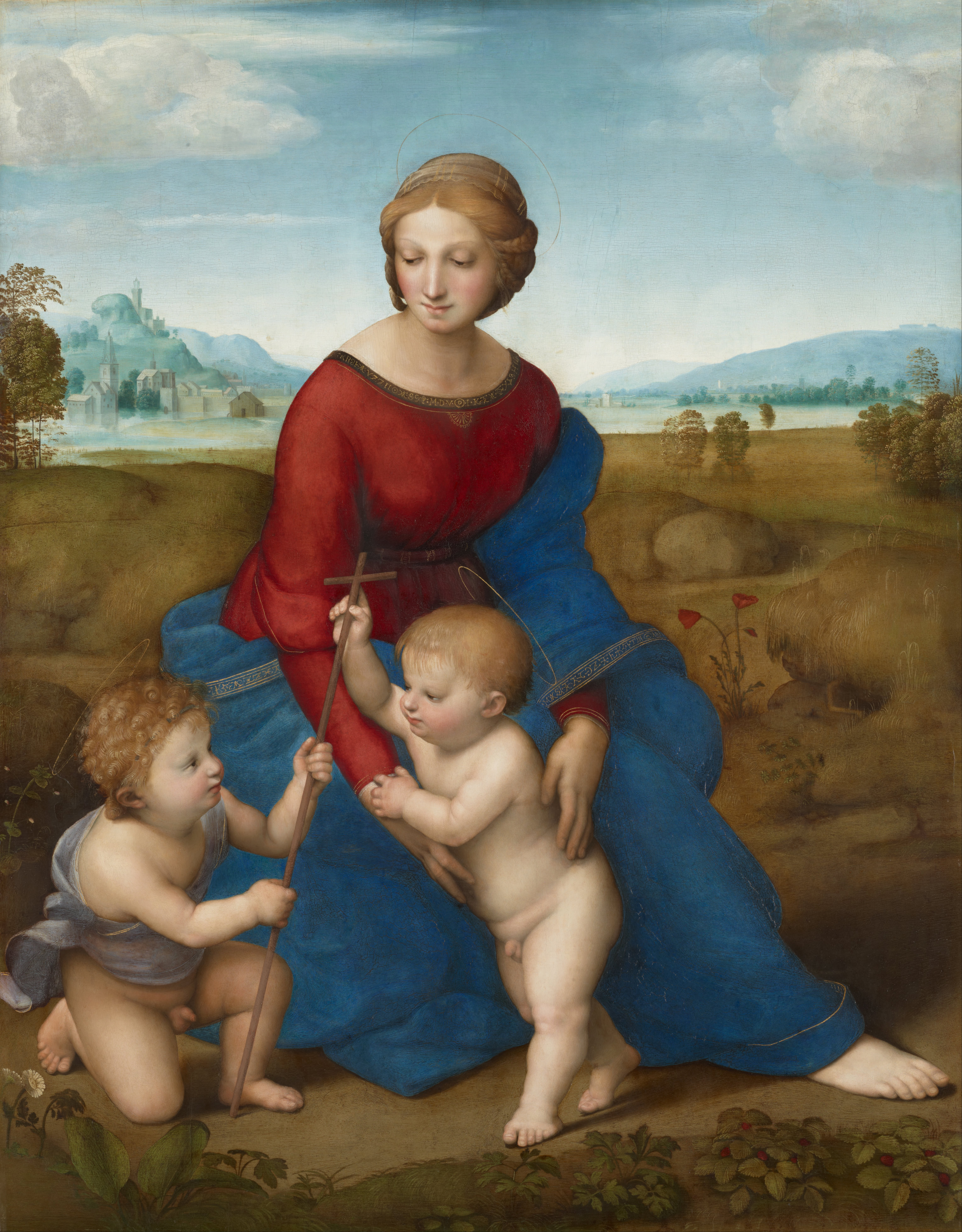
Raphael, Madonna del Prato (1506)

In 1504, echoes of the innovations unveiled by Leonardo and Michelangelo's cartoons reached Siena, where Raphael, a pupil of Perugino and now a promising young artist helping Pinturicchio decorate the Piccolomini Library, was staying. Deciding to go to Florence, he had a letter of recommendation prepared for him by Giovanna Feltria, Duchess of Sora, sister of the Duke of Urbino Giovanni della Rovere. In Florence, Raphael studied the local artistic tradition from the quattrocento to the most recent innovations, demonstrating an extraordinary capacity for assimilation.

Raphael worked mainly for private commissions, creating numerous small- and medium-format devotional paintings, especially of the Virgin and Child and the Holy Family. He also painted portraits. In these works, he continually varies the theme, seeking new groupings and attitudes, with a particular attention to naturalness, harmony and rich, intense colour with a background derived from the Umbrian style.

The starting point for his compositions is varied, and he takes certain suggestions from Donatello's Pazzi Madonna (in the Tempi Madonna) or Michelangelo's Taddei Tondo (in the Small Cowper Madonna and Bridgewater Madonna). From Leonardo, Raphael adopted the principles of plastic-spatial composition, but avoided allusions and symbolic implications. Moreover, he preferred spontaneous, natural feelings to "Leonardian indefiniteness". This is evident in portraits such as that of Maddalena Strozzi, where the mid-figure placement in the landscape, with hands folded, reveals his inspiration from the Mona Lisa, but with results where the description of physical lines, clothes and jewels, and the luminosity of the landscape, prevail.

Alternating between Umbria and Urbino, during this period he produced a work in Perugia, the Baglioni Altarpiece, created in Florence and inspired by Florentine trends. In the central compartment, he depicted The Deposition, the culmination of his studies and elaborations based on Perugino's Lamentation over the Dead Christ from the Florentine church of Santa Chiara. The artist thus created a dramatic, dynamic monumental composition in which clear signs of Michelangelo's style and of antiquity shine through, particularly in the Death of Meleager, which the artist saw during a trip to Rome in 1506.

His last work from the Florentine period of 1507–1508 is the Madonna of the Baldacchino, a large altarpiece with a sacra conversazione organised around the central point constituted by the Virgin's throne, with a grandiose architectonic background cut into the sides to amplify its monumentality. The work was a model for the following decade for artists such as Andrea del Sarto and Fra Bartolomeo.

Raphael, Small Cowper Madonna

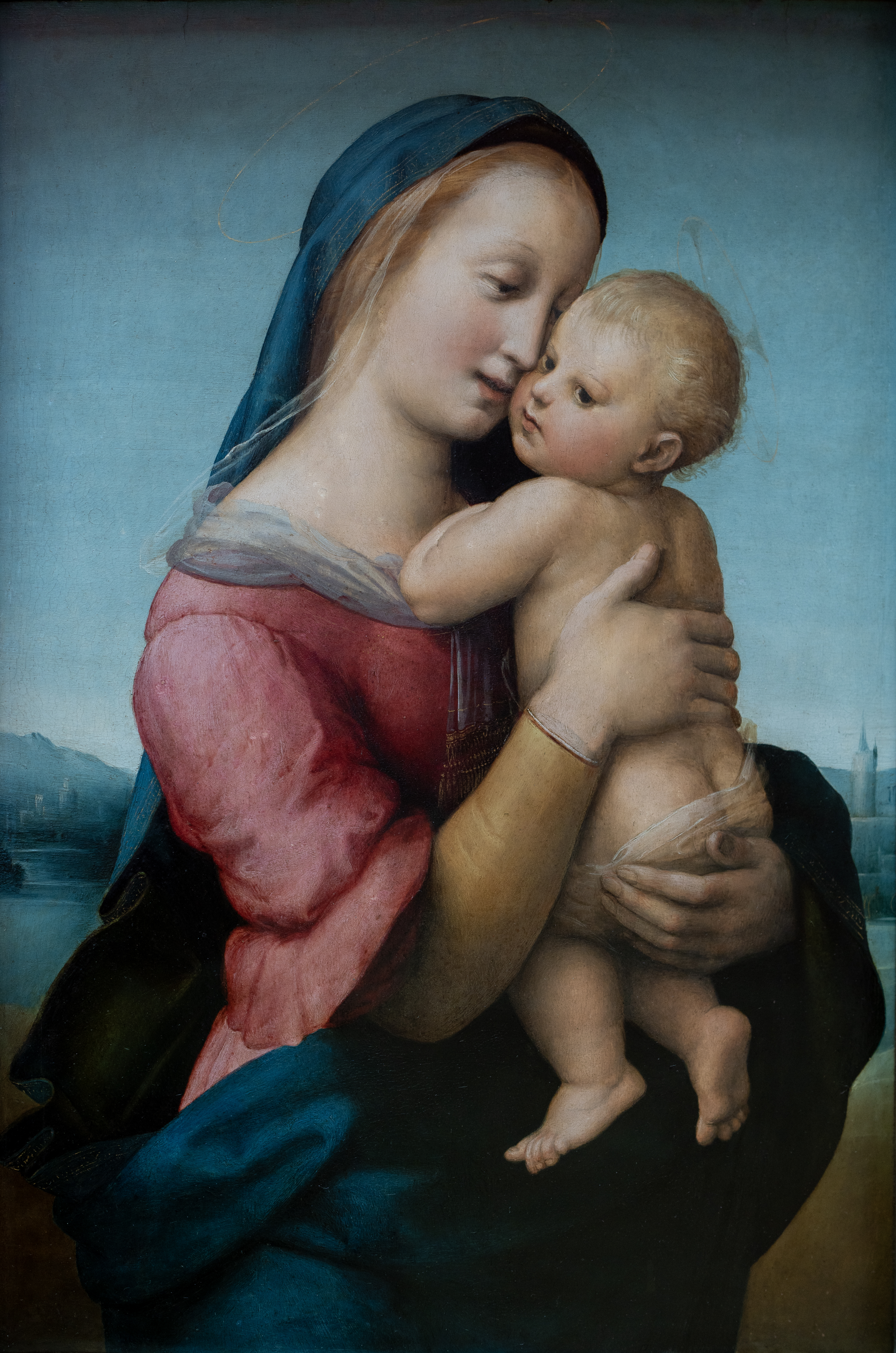
Raphael, Tempi Madonna

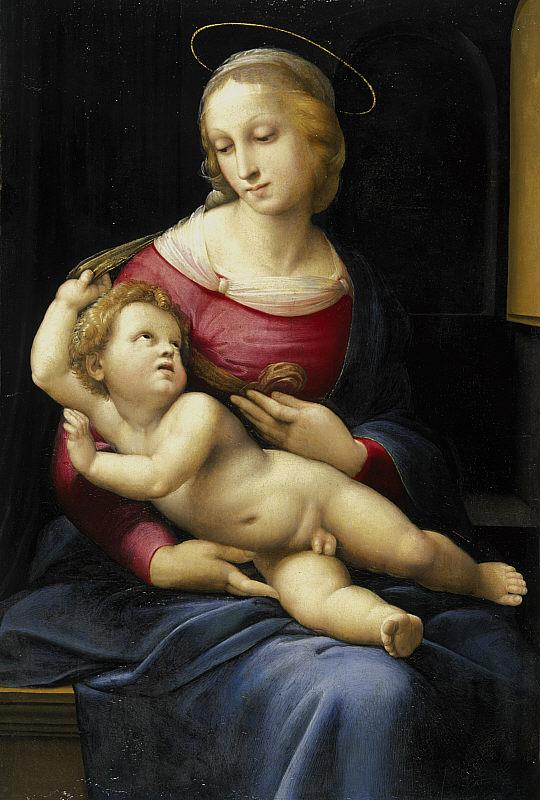
Raphael, Bridgewater Madonna

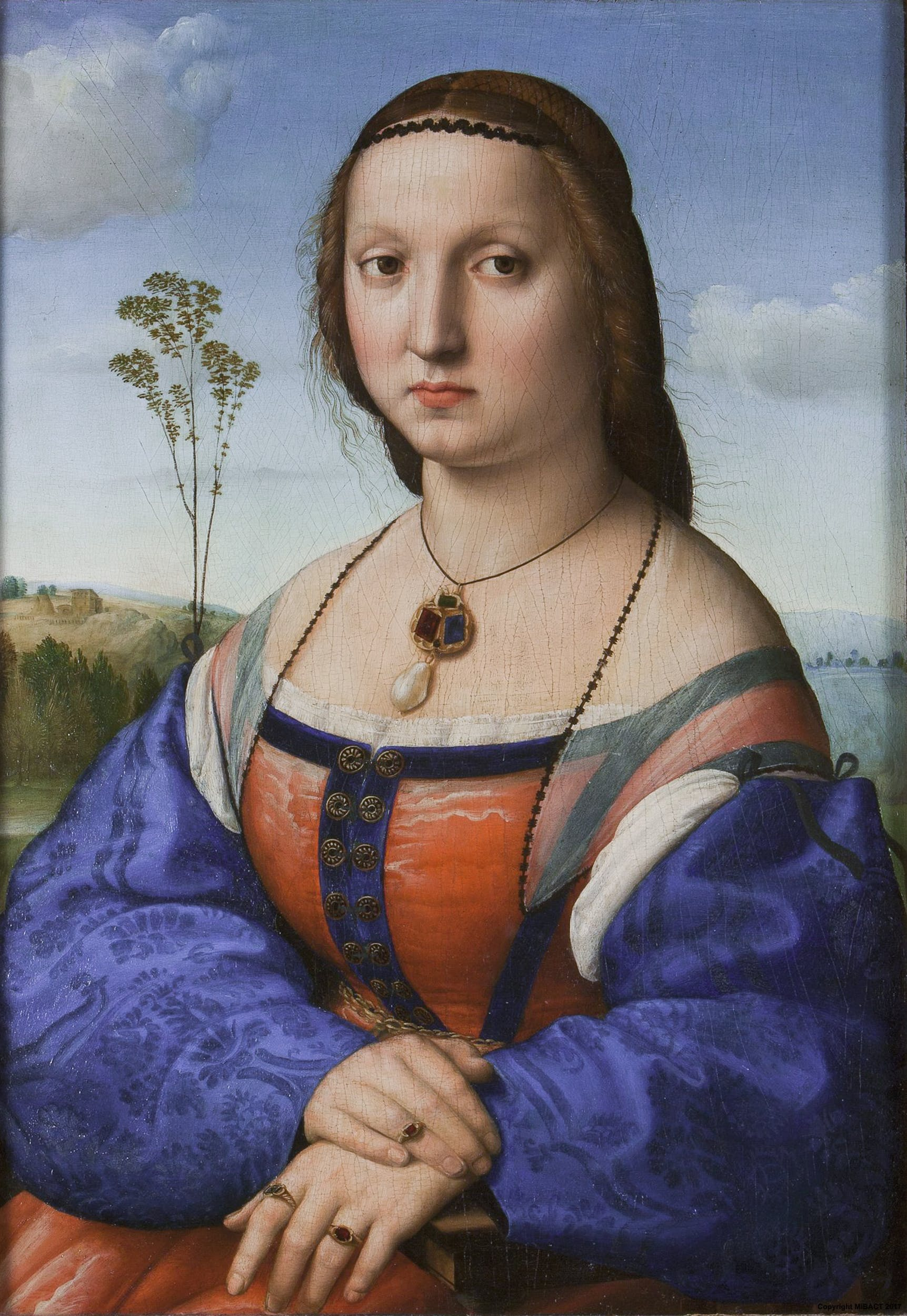
Raphael, Portrait of Maddalena Doni

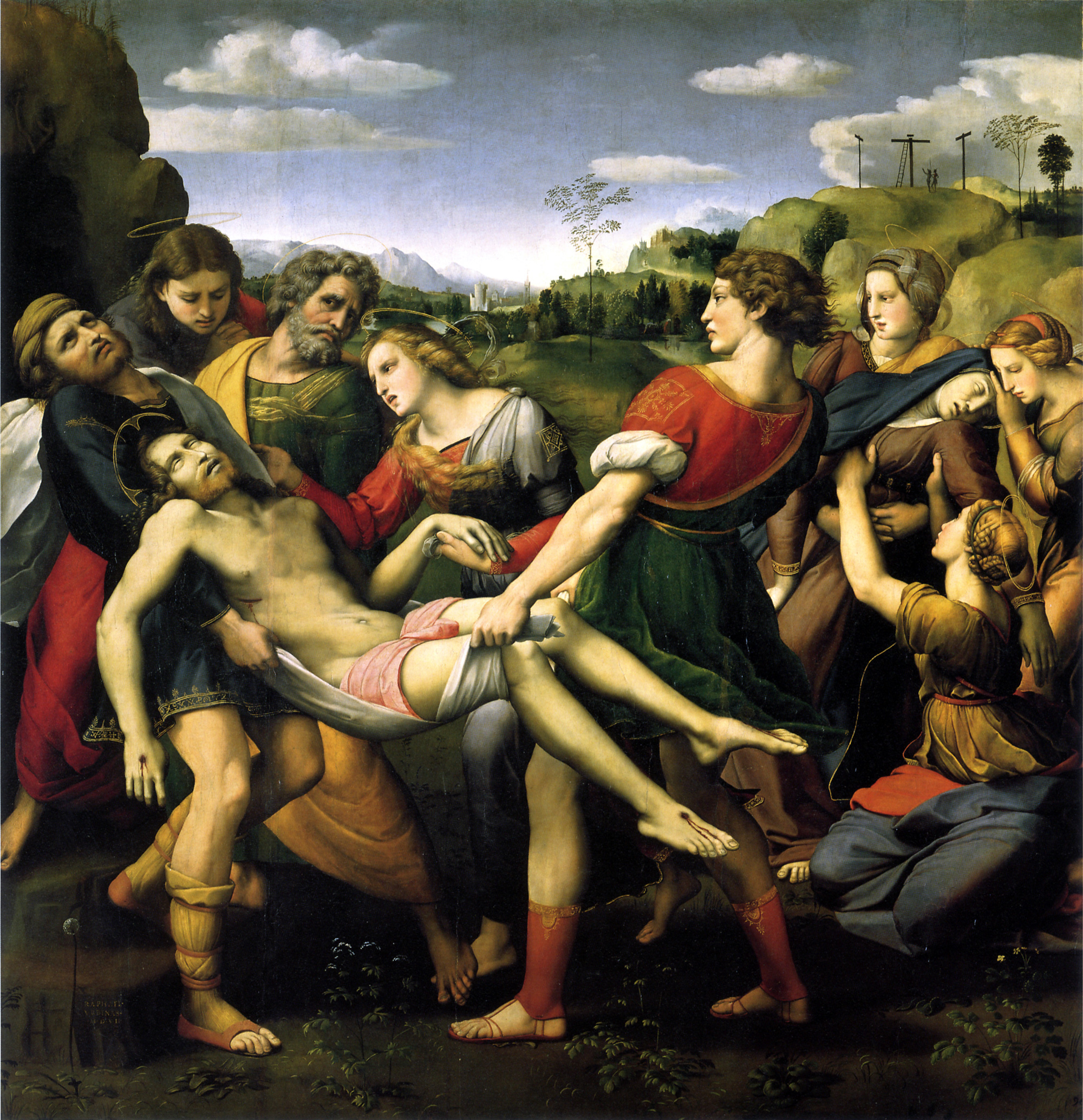
Raphael, The Deposition

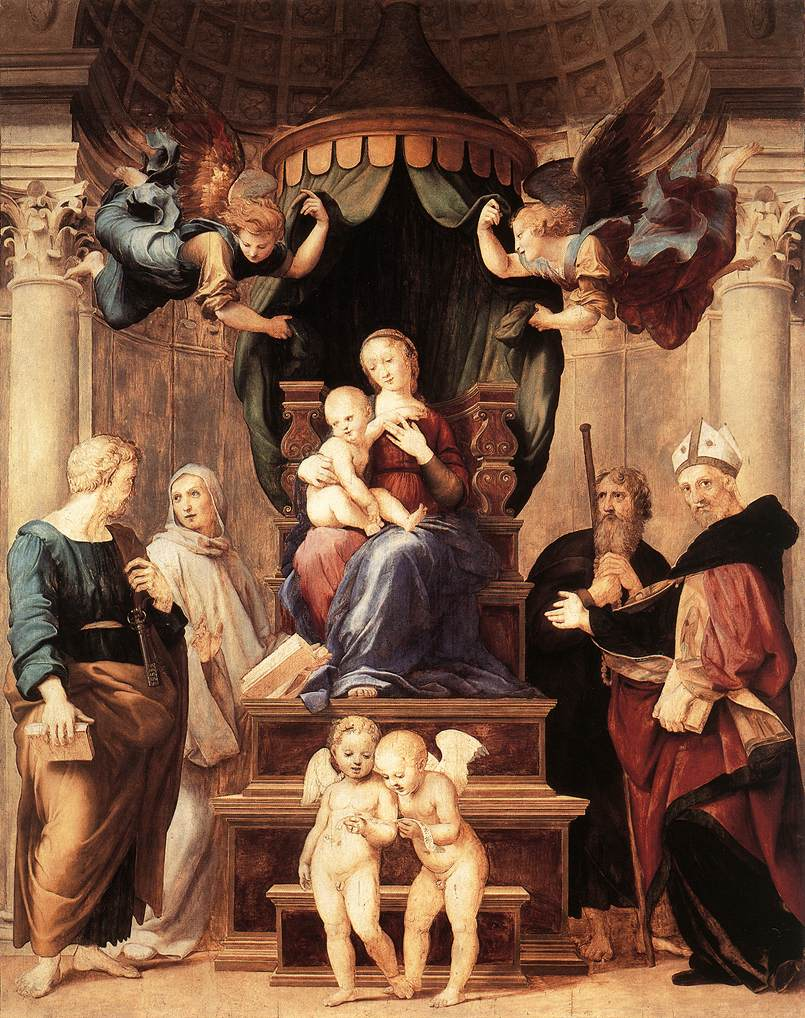
Raphael, Madonna of the Baldacchino

=== Other artists ===
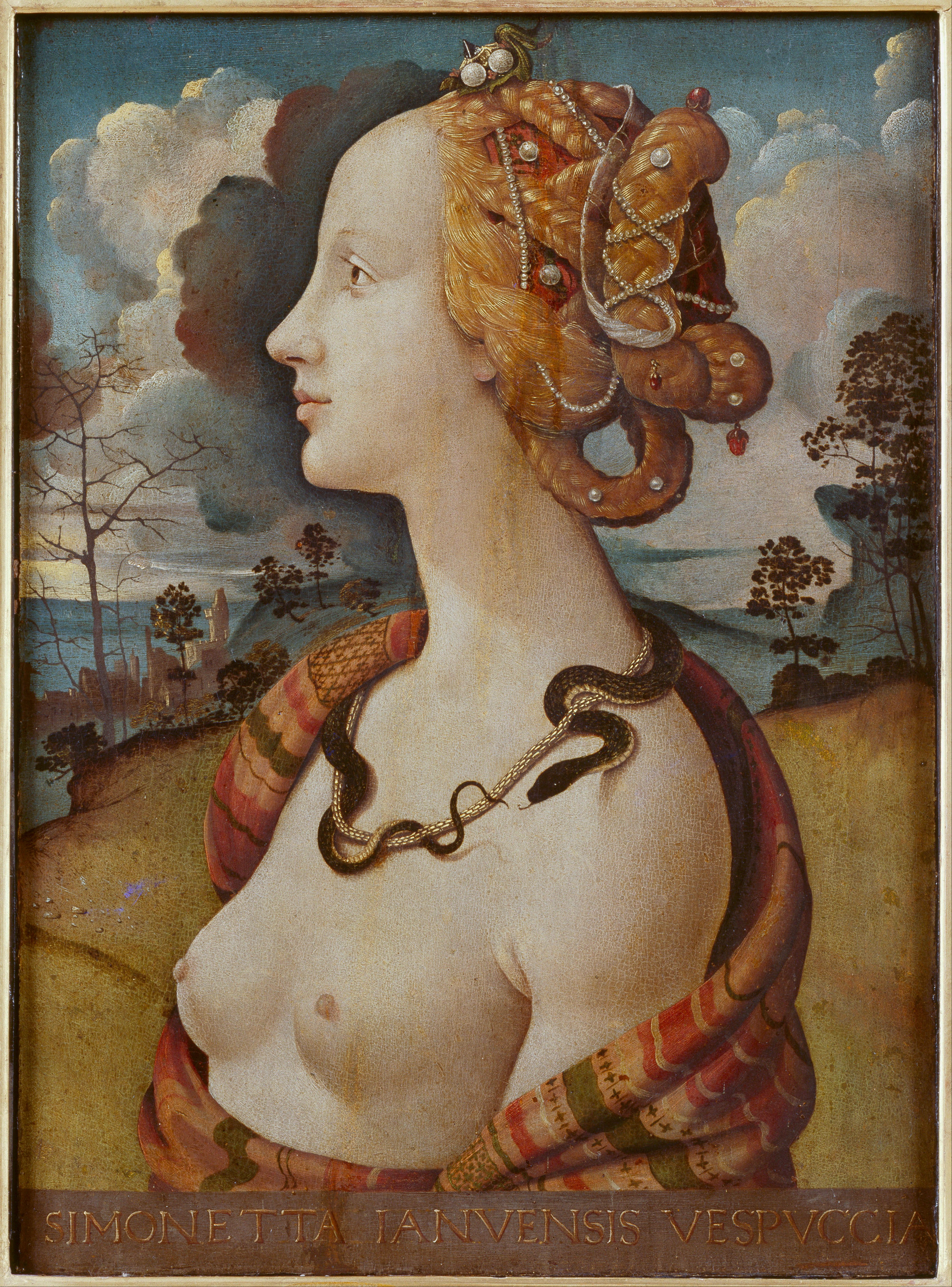
Piero di Cosimo, Portrait of Simonetta Vespucci (c. 1480)

During the early Cinquecento many other artists worked in Florence. They often brought with them alternative styles and content, but did not leave their mark on the period in any significant way.

Among them is Piero di Cosimo, the last great artist of the Florentine art tradition that stretches from Filippo Lippi to Botticelli and Ghirlandaio. Piero, who owes his nickname to his master Cosimo Rosselli, was an ingenious and imaginative artist, capable of creating singular and bizarre works. His work explores religious painting, portraits and mythological pictures. Many of his paintings play on a dualism between charming naivety and troubled eroticism that appears very "modern". Some seem to follow the theme of "Histories of Primitive Humanity".

In sculpture, Andrea Sansovino and his pupil Jacopo were alternatives to Michelangelo. Sansovino was a craftsman of slender, vibrant forms.

Other sculptors, such as Benedetto da Rovezzano, although very active and in demand, did not renew their repertoire, remaining faithful to the tradition of the 14th century.

In architecture, Giuliano and Antonio da Sangallo the Elder excelled in centrally planned religious buildings, while in private construction Baccio d'Agnolo imported classical "Roman-style" models, as in the Palazzo Bartolini Salimbeni.

== Crisis in the third decade of the 16th century ==
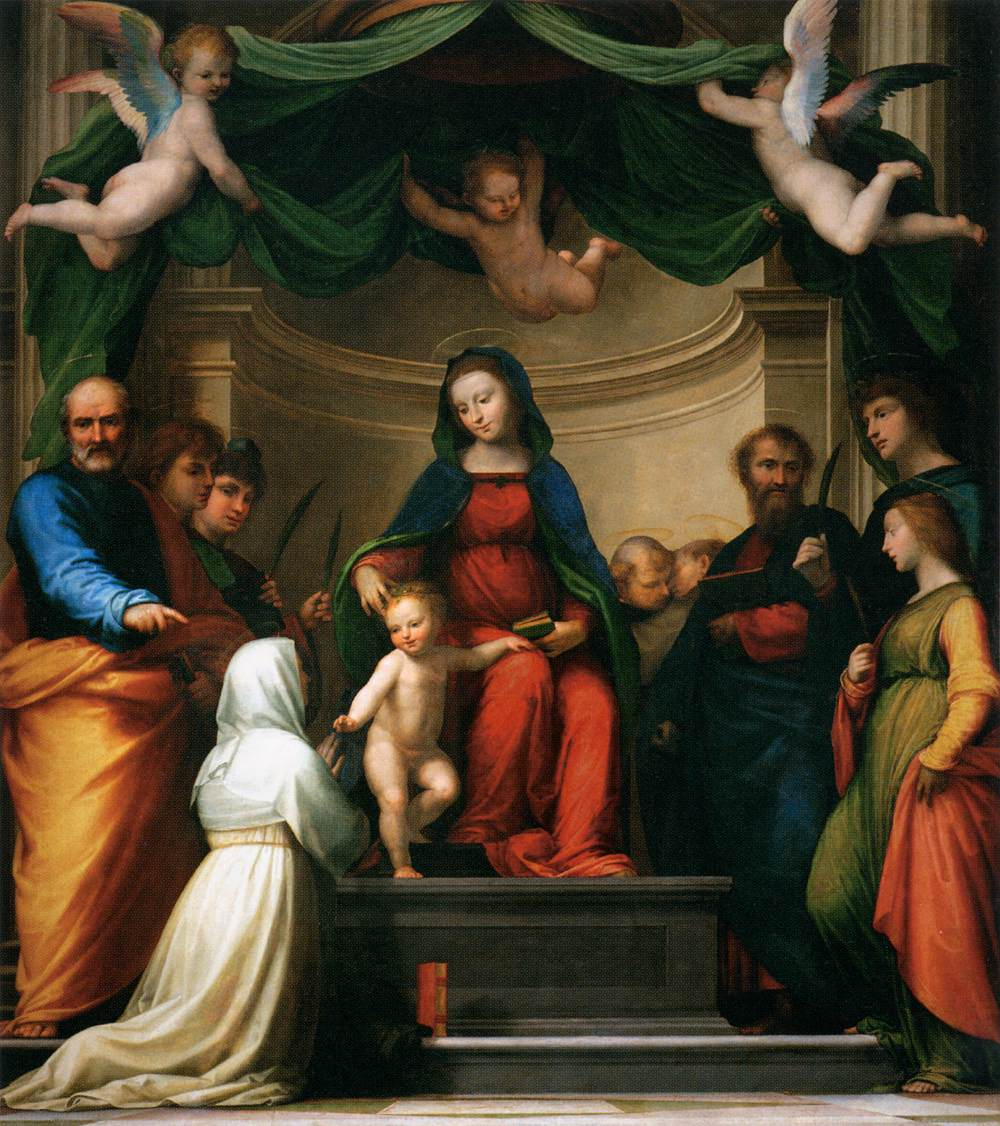
Fra Bartolomeo, The Mystical Marriage of Saint Catherine of Siena

The new generation of painters could not ignore the confrontation with the "greats" and their works that remained in the city. Leonardo, Michelangelo and Raphael set the standard. Nevertheless, there were trends that attempted to surpass their example, emphasising other characteristics to the point of exaggeration. These were the beginnings of Mannerism.

=== Fra Bartolomeo ===
After a four-year break caused by his taking of the vows, and influenced by Savonarola's preaching, Fra Bartolomeo began painting again in 1504. Initially influenced by his master Cosimo Rosselli and the entourage of Domenico Ghirlandaio, he moved towards a severe, essential conception of sacred images, opening himself up to the suggestions of the "greats", in particular Raphael, with whom he had made friends during his Florentine stay.

A trip to Venice enriched his palette, as evidenced by the altarpiece The Eternal Father with Saints (1508), characterised by austere, orderly eloquence. In The Mystical Marriage of Saint Catherine of Siena (1511), he followed the pattern of Raphael's Madonna of the Baldacchino, amplifying the monumentality of the figures and further varying the attitudes of the figures.

A trip to Rome allowed him to see the works of Michelangelo and Raphael at the Vatican, which, according to Vasari, disturbed him to such an extent that he eventually withdrew into himself, diminishing his vigour and innovative enthusiasm.

=== Andrea del Sarto ===
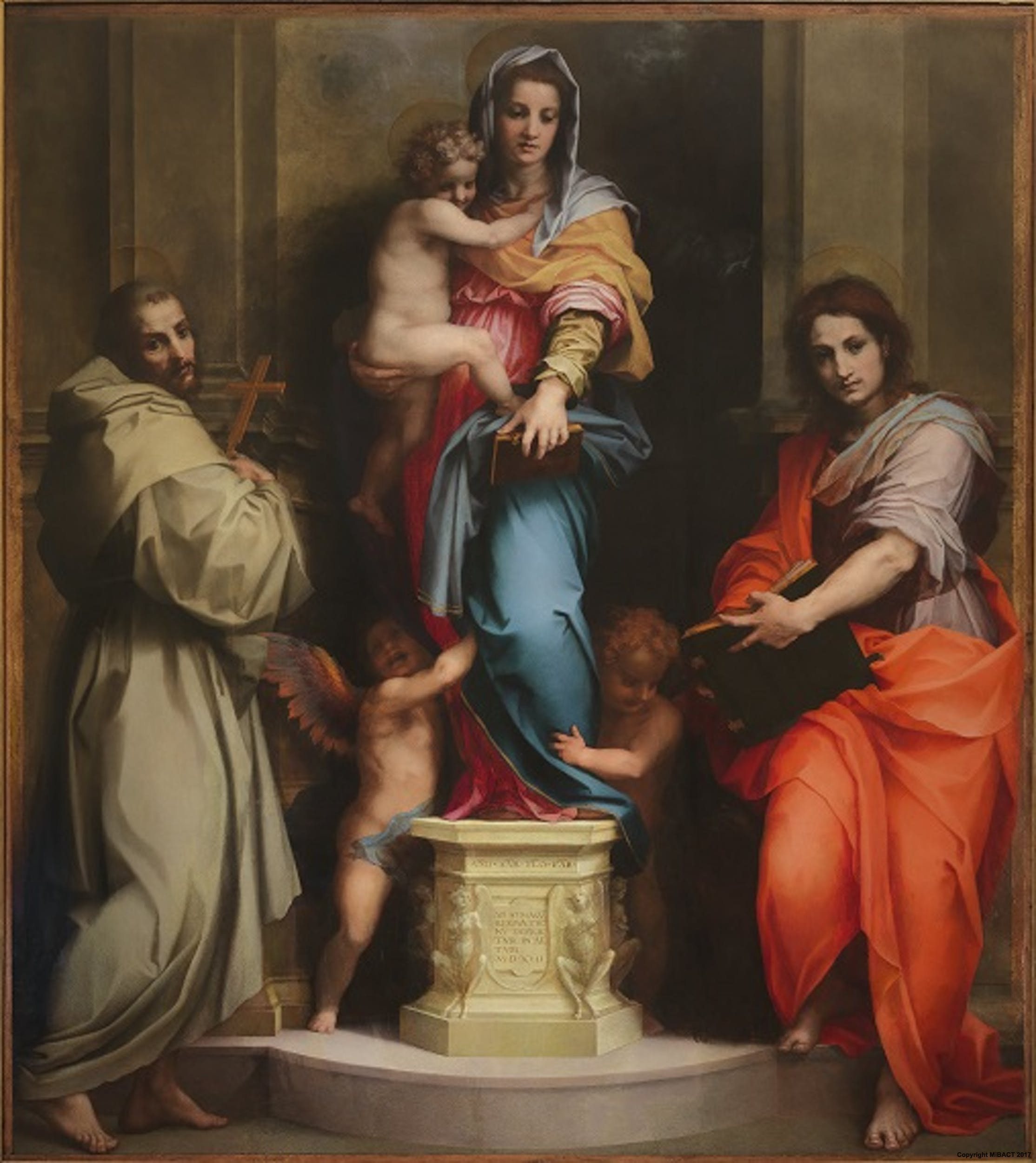
Andrea del Sarto, Madonna of the Harpies (1517)

Even for Andrea del Sarto, trained in Piero di Cosimo's workshop, the point of reference is the works of the three "geniuses" in Florence.

Experimenting with new iconographies and techniques, his first works can be found in the Chiostrino dei Voti (Cloister of the Vows) in Santissima Annunziata and in the monochrome frescoes in the Chiostro dello Scalzo. The modernity of his language, narrative style and well-ordered rhythms soon made him a point of reference for a group of contemporary artists such as Franciabigio, Pontormo and Rosso Fiorentino, who in the 1510s formed a school known as scuola dell'Annunziata, antagonistic to that of Fra Bartolomeo and Mariotto Albertinelli in San Marco, with its more solemn, calm stylistic accents.

Andrea del Sarto knew how to reconcile the chiaroscuro of Leonardo, the plasticity of Michelangelo and the classicism of Raphael, thanks to an impeccable execution, free and supple in its modelling, which earned him the appellation of pittore senza errori ('painter without error'). His Last Supper in the refectory of San Salvi remains a model of the genre, a fresco that took him 16 years to complete.

In 1517, he produced his masterpiece Madonna of the Harpies, with its pale colours and well-calibrated monumentality, without overdoing the anatomy like his younger colleagues.

In 1518–1519, he joined the court of Francis I of France. At Fontainebleau, he worked in the wake of the aged Leonardo, who died in 1519. He produced several lost works, including Charity, signed in 1518, a work typical of Florentine culture, with its pyramid-like construction and figurative plasticity. A certain malaise shortened the artist's presence in France, making his stay a "missed opportunity" (he would remain indebted to King Francis for the sums advanced), according to Vasari, who was recalled to Florence by his wife.

In Florence, he gradually turned to revising old designs, entrusting their execution to his workshop, with the exception of a few works such as the Madonna in Glory with Four Saints (1530) in the Palatine Gallery at Palazzo Pitti, whose characteristics anticipate the devotional motifs of the second half of the century.

=== Pontormo ===
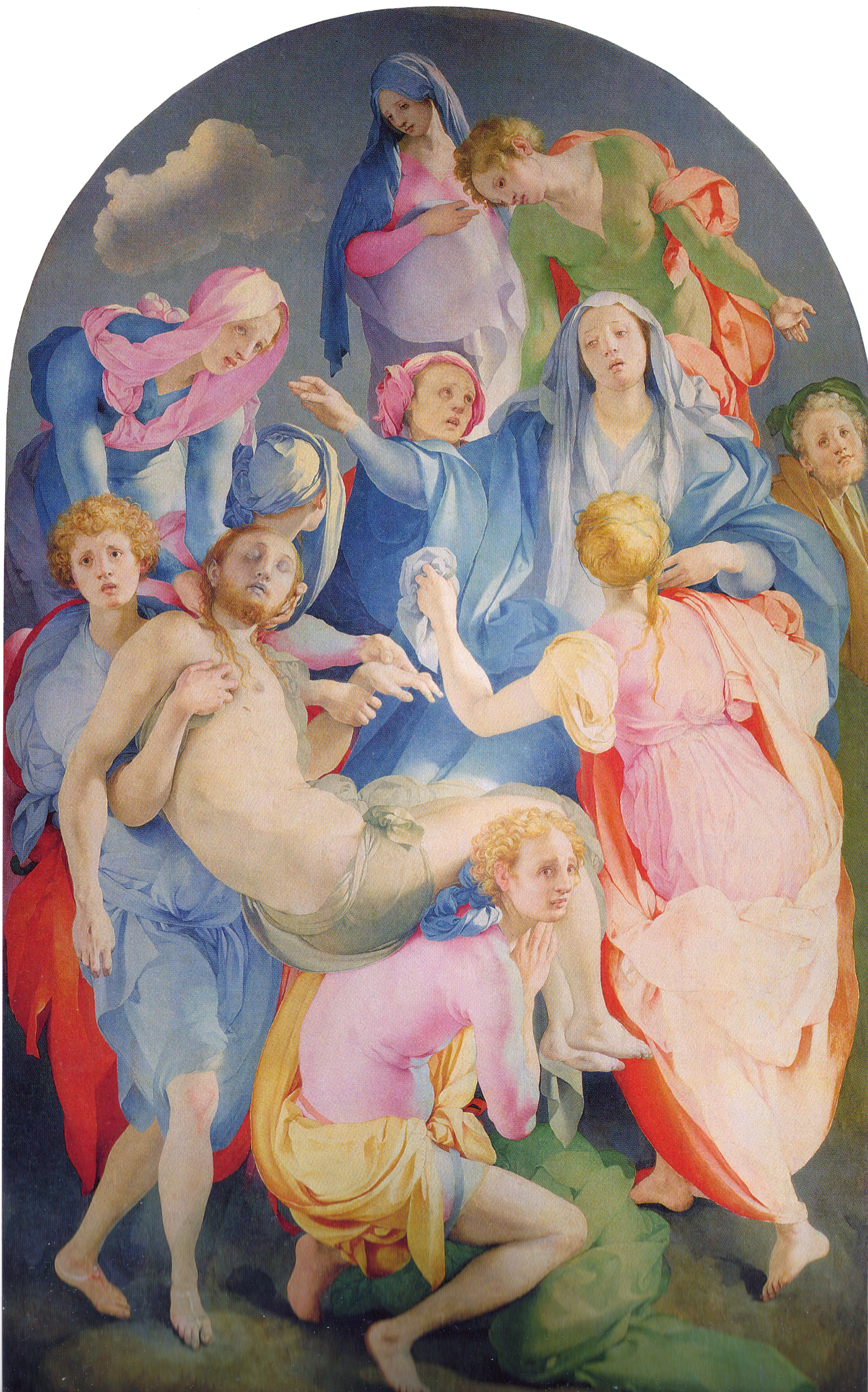
Pontormo, The Deposition from the Cross (1526–1528)

At first, Jacopo Pontormo imitated the well-ordered narrative style and rhythms of his master Andrea del Sarto, but he then began a process of renewing traditional patterns. The spatial and narrative organisation of episodes becomes more complex than that of his colleagues, as in Joseph in Egypt. The Pucci Altarpiece (1518) is even more innovative. The traditional pyramidal structure of the sacra conversazione is overturned, with the figures arranged along diagonal lines and the wide-eyed, worried expressions of the figures reminiscent of Leonardo.

Pontorno meticulously studied his subjects, and his work is the result of a mental process whose figures possess a suspended, crystallised beauty.

In 1521, he painted Vertumnus and Pomona, a bucolic scene in classical style for a lunette in the Medici villa at Poggio a Caiano. From 1522 to 1525, he lived in the Carthusian monastery in Florence, where he created a series of frescoes inspired by the engravings of Albrecht Dürer. His choice of a model from beyond the Alps, already very popular throughout northern Italy, confirmed his break with the traditional canons of the Florentine Renaissance. This choice of new reformist ideas from Germany was criticised by Giorgio Vasari.

=== Rosso Fiorentino ===
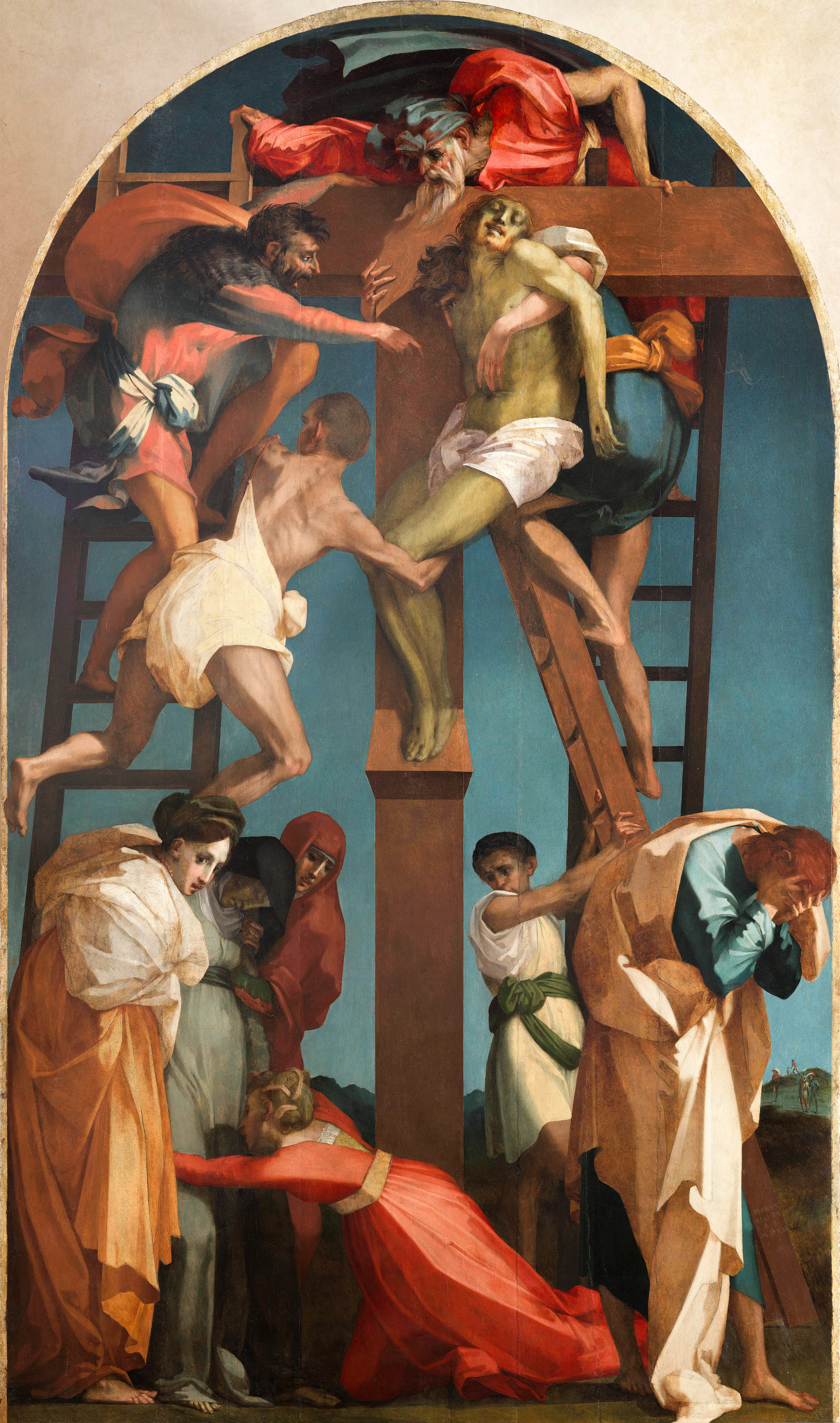
Rosso Fiorentino, Volterra Deposition (1521)

Rosso Fiorentino, also a pupil of Andrea del Sarto, shared Pontormo's artistic path until 1523, when he left Florence for Rome. He participated in all the innovations of the period, revising traditional concepts. He focused on expressive, almost caricatural distortion, by drawing on the works of Filippino Lippi and Piero di Cosimo. His masterpiece, the Volterra Deposition (1521) originally at the cathedral of that city, reveals his search for synthetic forms. In this painting, the placement of the figures is governed by an interweaving of almost paradoxical lines, such as the double direction of the ladders set against the Cross. Various figures with forced expressions make frenzied, exalted gestures. In October 1530, Rosso Fiorentino joined Francis I's court. He is considered the founder of the first School of Fontainebleau, which launched the French Renaissance in the art of painting.

=== Michelangelo at San Lorenzo ===
In 1515, the solemn visit of Pope Leo X (Giovanni de' Medici, son of Lorenzo the Magnificent) to his native city signalled the return of the Medici signoria after the Republican interlude. The city's finest artists participated in the creation of ephemeral decorative displays. Jacopo Sansovino and Andrea del Sarto created the ephemeral facade for the unfinished cathedral. This work impressed the Pope, who soon afterwards launched a competition for another unfinished facade, that of the Basilica of San Lorenzo, patronised by the Medici family. Of the designs submitted by artists such as Giuliano da Sangallo, Raphael, and Jacopo and Andrea Sansovino, the Pope finally chose Michelangelo's, characterised by a rectangular profile that differed from the "gabled" shape of the basilica's naves. The project, which also included a vast decoration of marble and bronze sculptures, went ahead at the end of 1517, but a series of events linked to the supply of materials slowed down the work and pushed up costs.

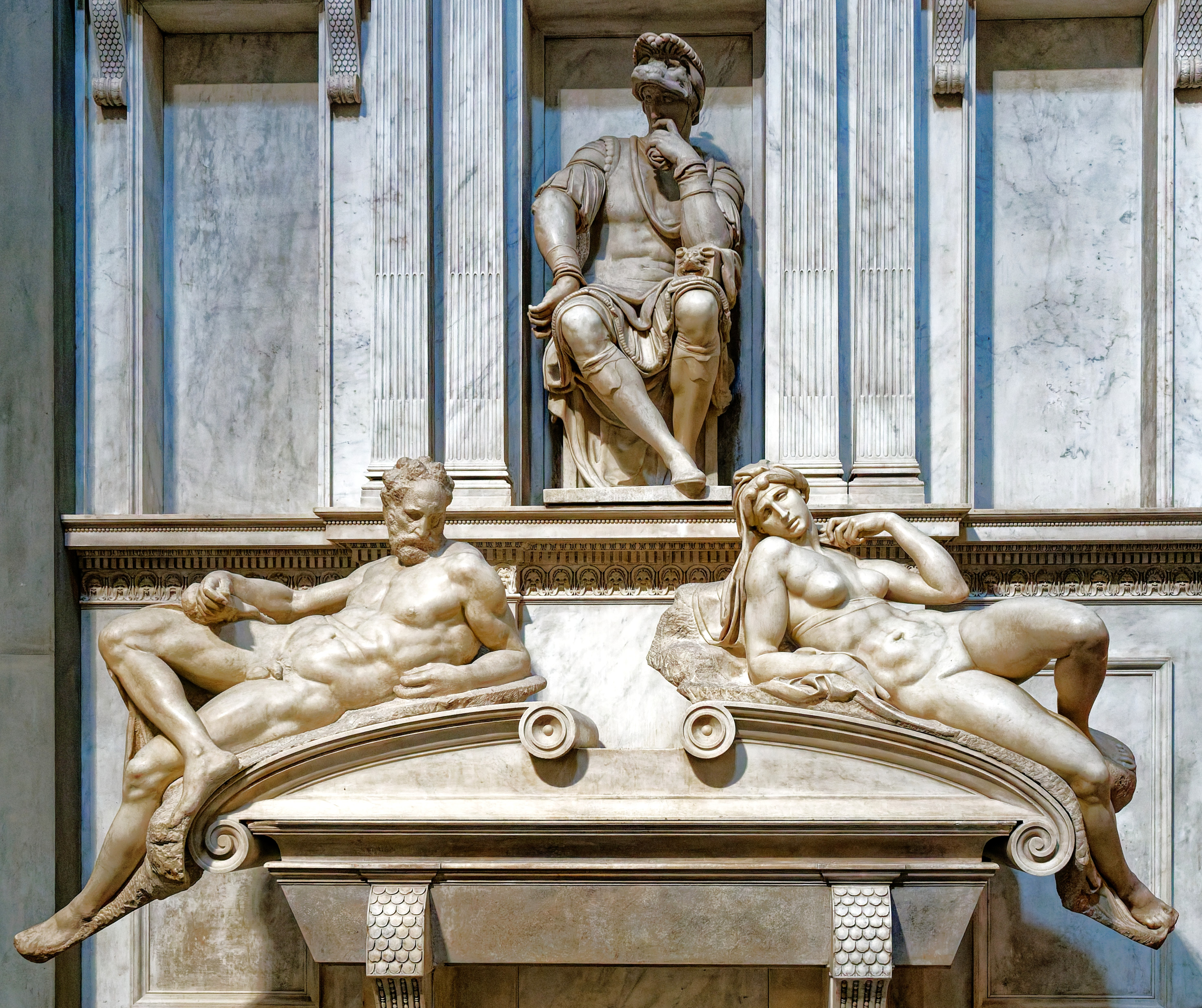
Michelangelo's Tomb of Lorenzo de' Medici, Duke of Urbino, with the figures of Dusk and Dawn, New Sacristy, San Lorenzo

In 1519, Lorenzo de' Medici, Duke of Urbino (a nephew of Leo X), died; this jeopardised the Medici dynasty, coming as it did three years after the death of the Pope's brother Giuliano de' Medici, Duke of Nemours. The Pope changed his plans and decided to build a funeral chapel known as the New Sacristy. (Note: The New Sacristy commission was intended to create a monument housing the tombs of the Pope's father Lorenzo the Magnificent, his uncle Giuliano, his nephew Lorenzo, Duke of Urbino, and his brother Giuliano, Duke of Nemours.) Michelangelo was commissioned to carry out the project.

As early as 1520, a letter from the artist, in which he complained about the delay in the facade project, tells us that studies for the chapel had already begun. (Note: Delays in the work bogged down the funereal architectural project, which was probably thwarted by the papacy's budgetary vacuity at the beginning of the Cinquecento.) The chapel was similar in shape and symmetrical to Brunelleschi's Old Sacristy, built a century earlier.

Initially, Michelangelo presented a project with a central plan that followed the layout of the first project for the Tomb of Julius II, but lack of space required an alternative solution with the funerary monuments placed against the walls. (Note: To get around this space restriction, Michelangelo opted for an architectural plan featuring two interlocking volumes: a cube topped by a dome.) In terms of architecture, the layout of the walls differs from Brunelleschi's model in that the windows are inserted in an intermediate space between the lower wall and the large lunettes below the dome. The tombs are attached to the walls, with statues in niches, and take the form of aediculae above the doors and windows.

In 1521, the death of the Pope led to an initial suspension of work. Work resumed with the election of Clement VII (Giulio de' Medici), but was interrupted in 1527 following the Sack of Rome and the final establishment of the Republic in Florence.

In 1530, the city was taken over by the Medici, and Michelangelo frantically resumed work until 1534, the year of his final departure for Rome. He created the statues of the two dukes in classical style, showing little interest in achieving accurate likenesses, and the four Allegories of Time, elongated figures of Night, Day, Dusk and Dawn, complementary in theme and pose, as well as the Medici Madonna. The general theme is that of the survival of the Medici dynasty and the comfort provided by religion (the Madonna), to which the eyes of the two dukes are eternally turned. The other figurative allegories (of rivers) remain unrealised, as do the bronze bas-reliefs and frescoes which were probably intended to decorate the lunettes.

From 1524, work on the sacristy was intertwined with that on another major project at San Lorenzo, the Laurentian Library, commissioned by Clement VII. The reading room, based on Michelozzo's design for the Basilica of San Marco, has a longitudinal development and numerous windows on all sides, without resorting to the partition into naves. The chording of the walls and the exact replication of the ceiling design in the paving create a geometric sweep of space in conflict with the violent plastic contrasts and strong verticality of the vestibule.

As Vasari reminds us, Michelangelo's architecture at San Lorenzo had a strong influence on the artistic culture of the time, introducing the theme of "licence" into classical architectural language.

== See also ==
- Greek scholars in the Renaissance
- Italian Renaissance
- Renaissance art
- Renaissance art in Bergamo and Brescia
- Renaissance in Lombardy
- Roman Renaissance
- Sienese school
- Venetian Renaissance
