= Holy Trinity with Saints =

Painting by Andrea del Castagno

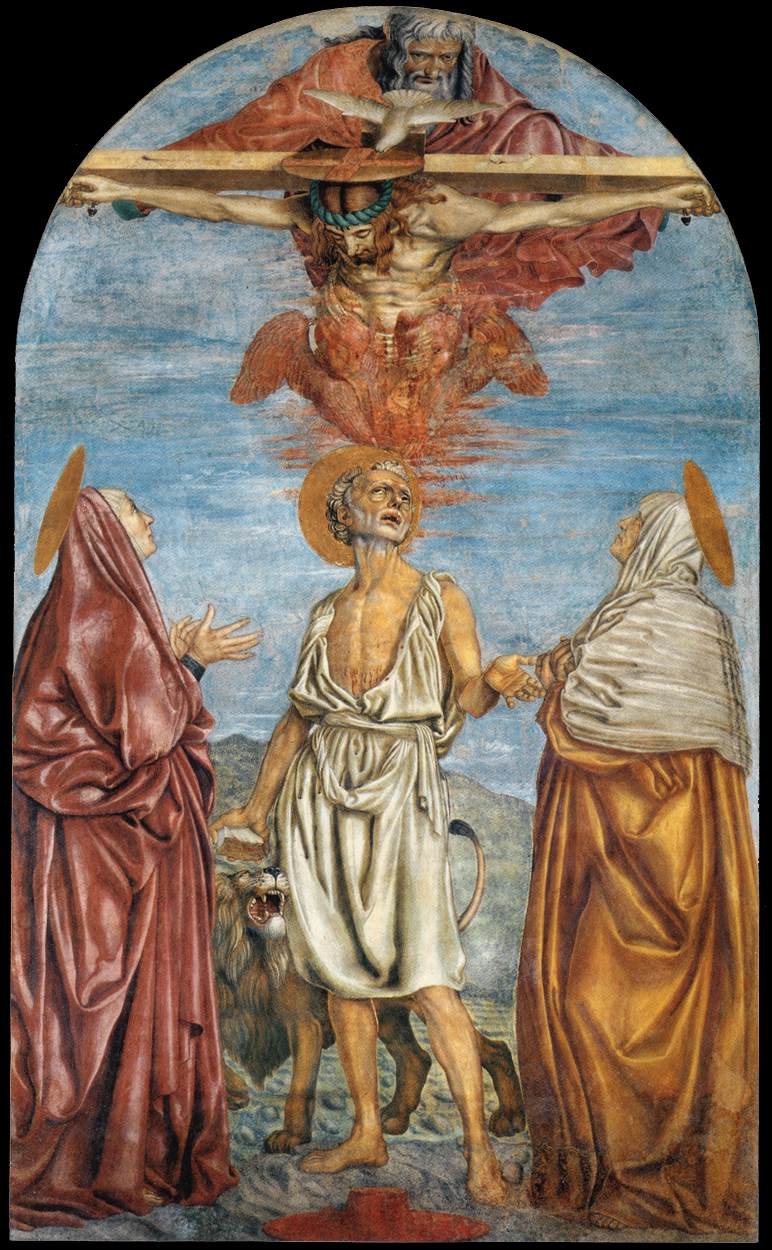
Holy Trinity with Saints (1453-1454) by Andra del Castagno

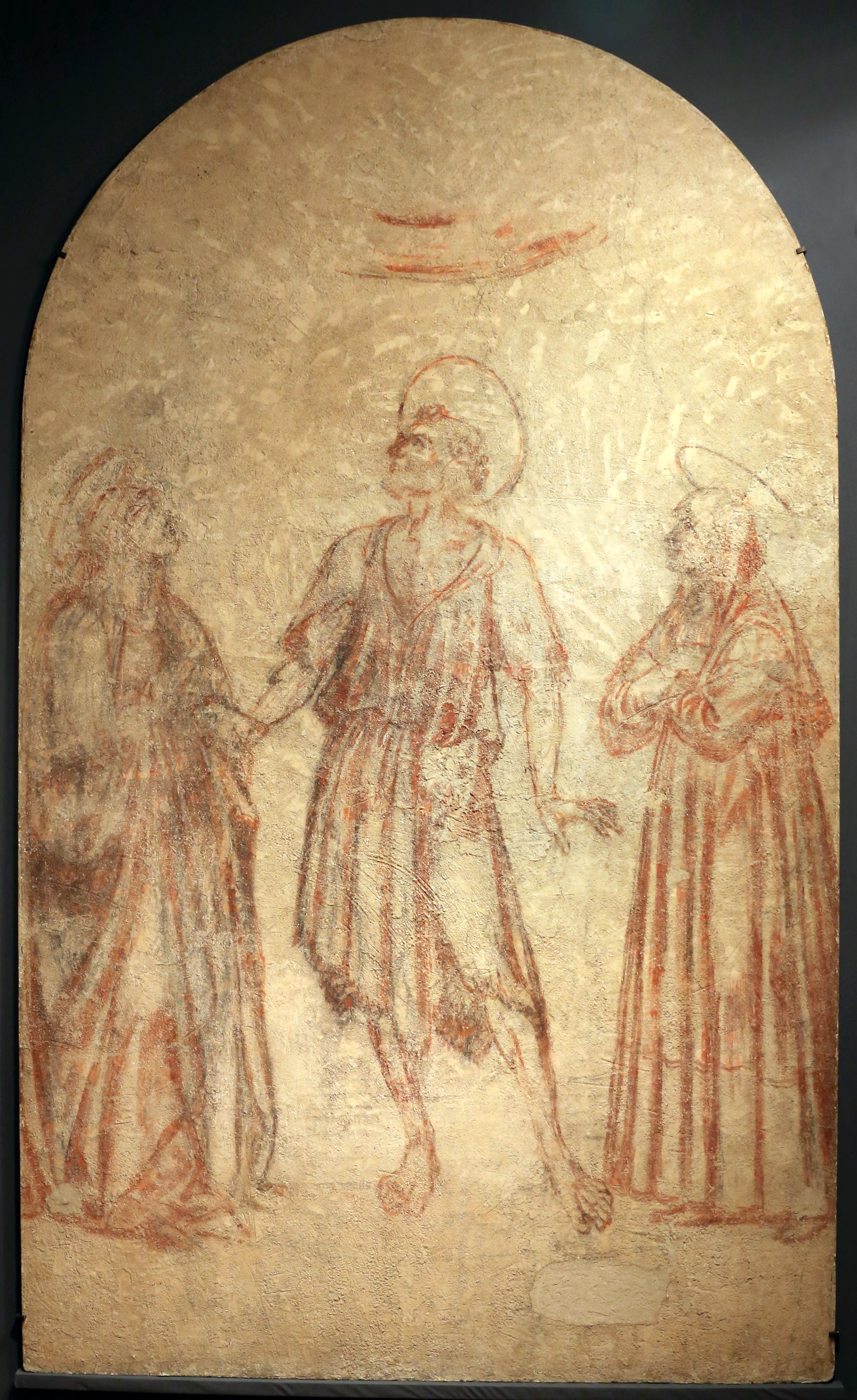
The sinopia

Holy Trinity with Saints or Saints Jerome, Paula and Eustochium's Vision of the Holy Trinity is a 1453–1454 fresco by Andrea del Castagno, painted for Gerolamo Corboli (shown as saint Jerome) just after the same artist's Saint Julian the Hospitaller with Christ the Redeemer in the neighbouring chapel and the lost frescoes of Sant'Egidio. It is still in its original position in Santissima Annunziata, Florence, whilst a sinopia of the three saints (Jerome, Paula of Rome and Eustochium) is now in the Museo del Cenacolo di Sant'Apollonia, also in Florence.

The work was covered by a new altarpiece of the Last Judgement by Alessandro Allori when the chapel was transferred to the Caiani family in 1553 and the fresco was only rediscovered in the 1930s by the Benini studio, run by an old family of Florentine restorers, who restored it. In 1967, following the flood the previous year, it was removed from the wall and restored again, at which time the sinopia was discovered and removed.

== Bibliography ==
- (in Italian) Pierluigi De Vecchi ed Elda Cerchiari, I tempi dell'arte, volume 2, Bompiani, Milano 1999. ISBN 88-451-7212-0
- (in Italian) Marco Ciatti con la collaborazione di Francesca Martusciello, Appunti per un manuale di storia e di teoria del Restauro, Dispense per studenti, Edifir Edizioni Firenze, Firenze 2009. ISBN 978-88-7970-346-8
