= Santa Maria degli Angeli Crucifixion =

Painting by Andrea del Castagno

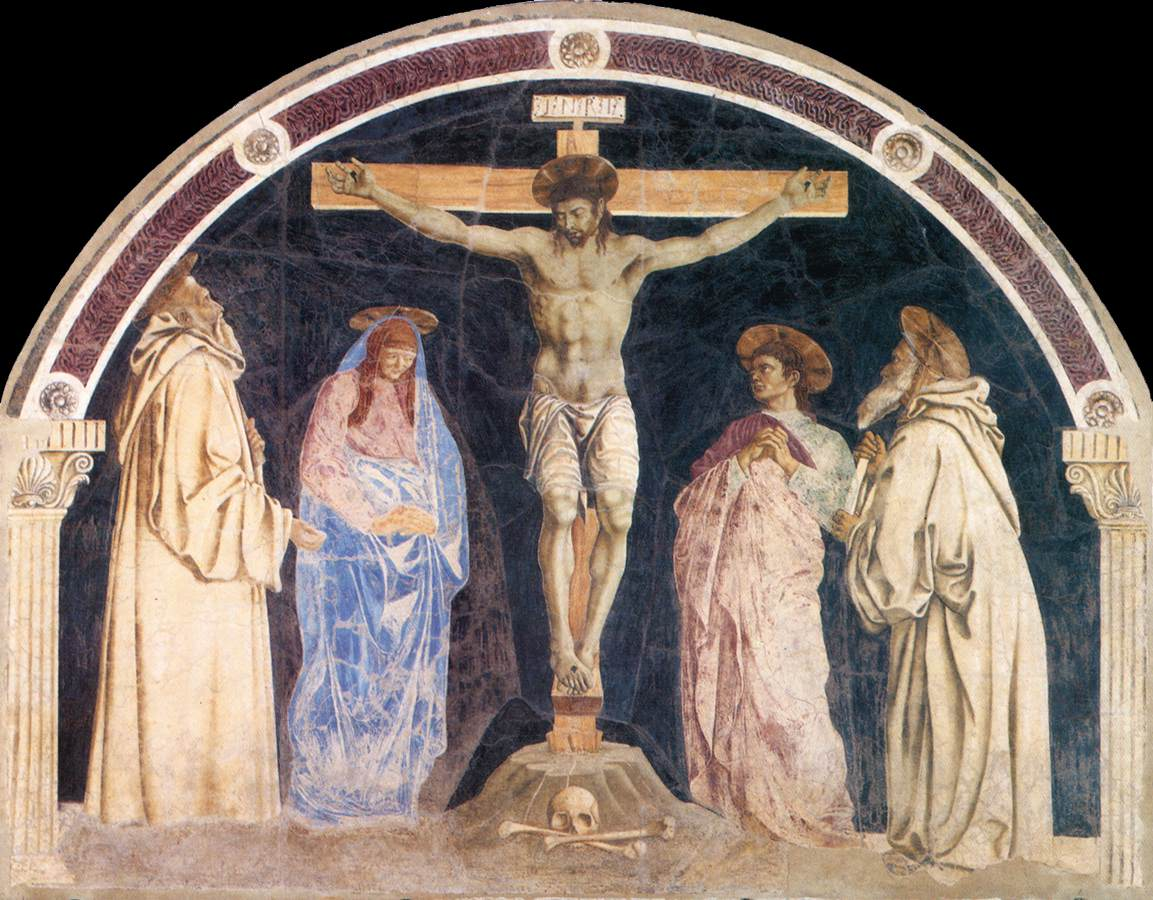
Santa Maria degli Angeli Crucifixion (c. 1455) by Andrea del Castagno

The Santa Maria degli Angeli Crucifixion is a fresco lunette by Andrea del Castagno, created c. 1455. It is held in the Museo del Cenacolo di Sant'Apollonia, in Florence. At far left and right are Romuald and Benedict of Nursia. It was originally sited in the cloister of the monastery of Santa Maria degli Angeli, Florence, where several authors wrote of seeing it, including the anonymous Gaddiano and Vasari, with the latter mentioning it in both editions of his Lives of the Artists as "at the top of cloister over the garden". Giuseppe Richa wrote that it was rediscovered by a Camaldolese monk of the monastery. Milanesi, Cavalcaselle and Crowe did not judge it to be an autograph work, perhaps since they saw it in a poorly-lit setting, but it is now held to be an autograph work. Its dating is uncertain – Salmi and Horster place it late in his career, which is the majority opinion.
