= Santa Maria Nuova Crucifixion =

Painting by Andrea del Castagno

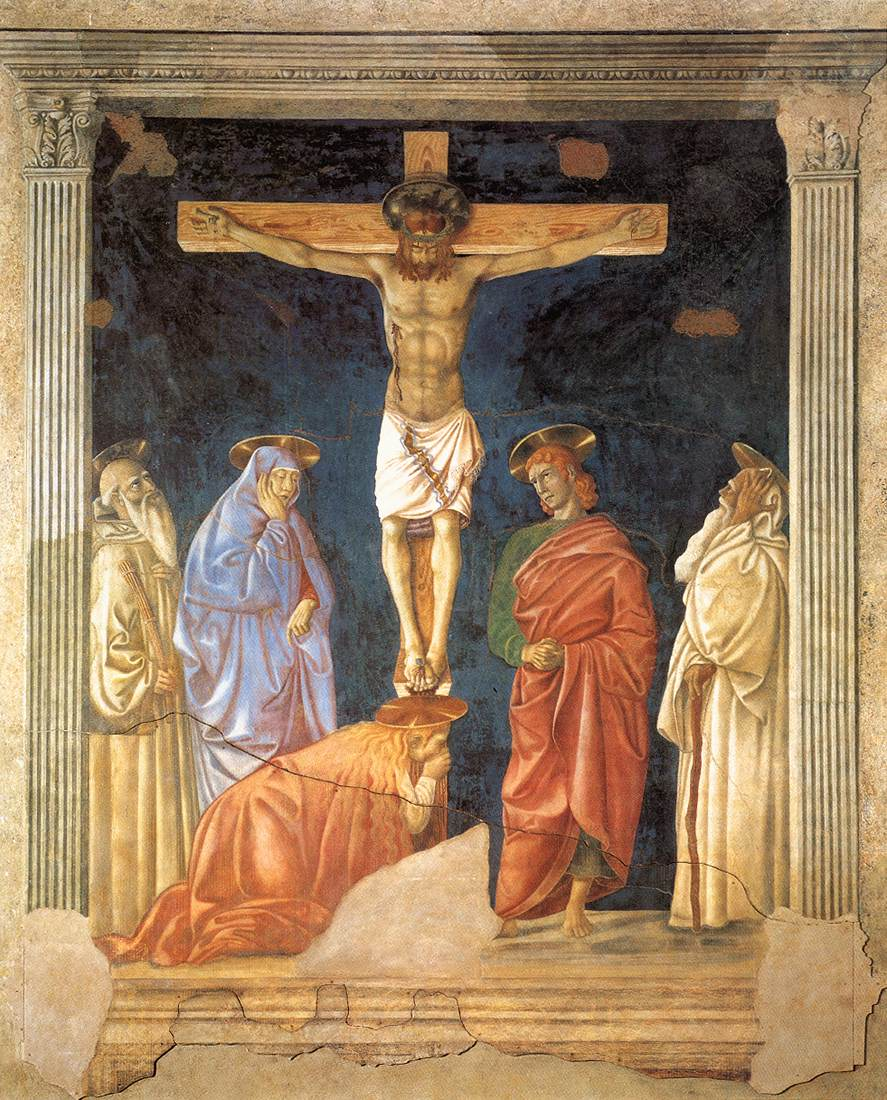
Santa Maria Nuova Crucifixion (1440-1441) by Andrea del Castagno

The Santa Maria Nuova Crucifixion is a fragment of a fresco created in 1440–41 by the early Italian Renaissance artist Andrea del Castagno. It is in the Ospedale di Santa Maria Nuova in Florence.

It is recorded in the Libro di Antonio Billi, Vasari and the anonymous Gaddiano, confirming it as being by del Castagno. Berti relates the work to that painter's 1442 frescoes of San Zaccaria in Venice, so much so that he theorised that the same studio assistant to the master worked on the Venetian church, Francesco da Faenza. It shows saint Romauld and saint Benedict at the far left and right, which in 1982 Barucca used to link it to a commission from the Camaldolese monastery of Santa Maria degli Angeli, some of whose rooms were merged into Santa Maria Nuova in 1870.

While the work was being removed from the wall a fire destroyed the lower half of the fresco, meaning Tintori had to reconstruct it using earlier archive photographs. The work's sinopia is incomplete and also held in the Soprintendenza store.
