= David with the Head of Goliath (Castagno) =

Painting by Andrea del Castagno

- Italian: David con la testa di golia
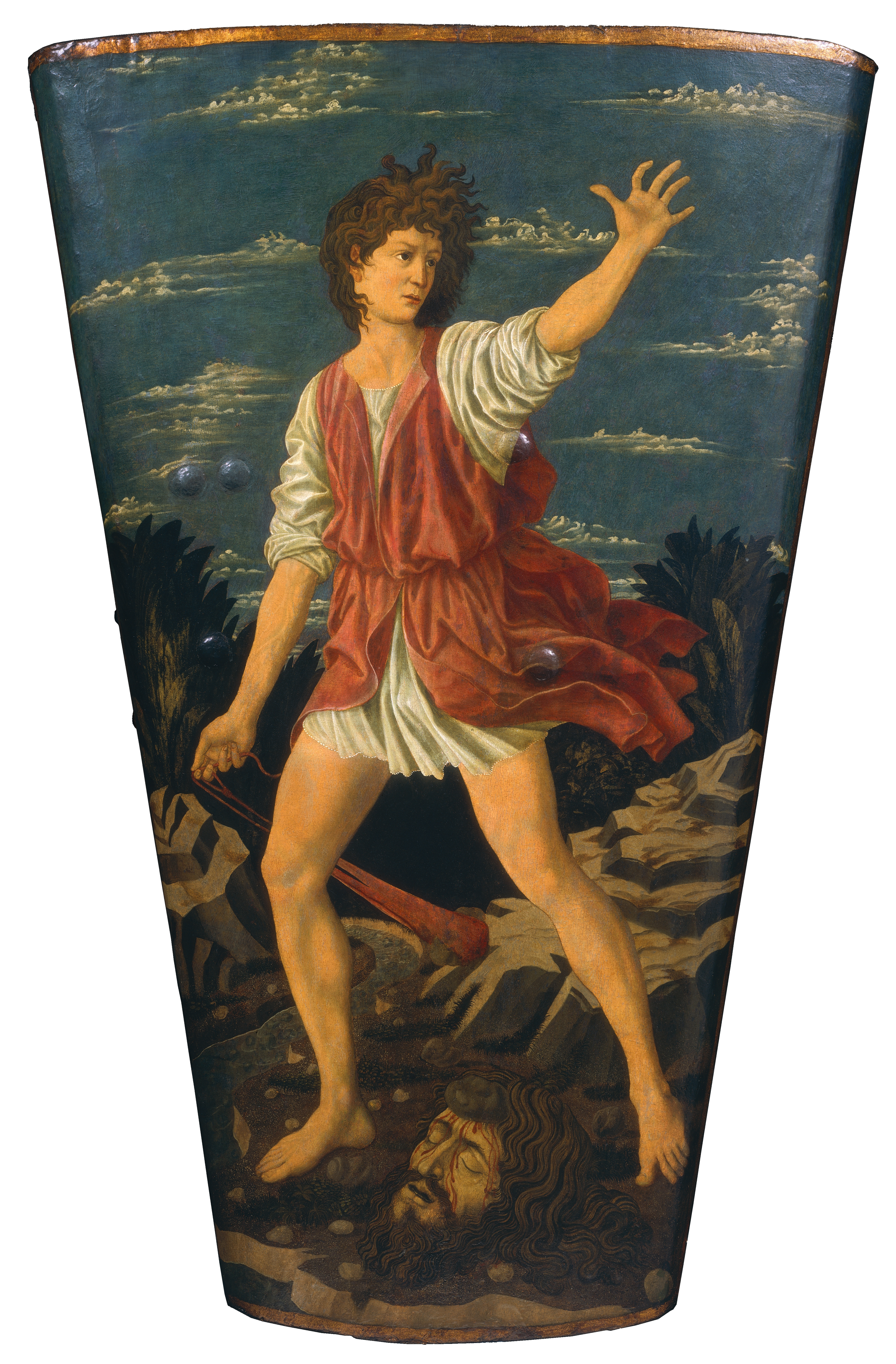
- Artist: Andrea del Castagno
- Year: ca. 1450–1457
- Type: Tempera on leather on wood
- Dimensions: 115.5 cm × 76.5 cm (45.5 in × 30.1 in)
- Location: National Gallery of Art, Washington, D.C.

David with the Head of Goliath is a painting on a parade shield of leather and wood by the Italian Renaissance painter Andrea del Castagno, created around 1450–1457. It measures 115.5 x 76.5 (at the top) and 40.6 (at the bottom) centimeters. It is now in the collection of the National Gallery of Art, Washington, D.C.

== History and description ==
The painting decorates an ornamental parade shield, curved at the edges, and not designed for actual fighting. These were often painted, but very rarely with a single figure, especially a Biblical one (David slaying Goliath) rather than a coat of arms, or a more ornamental design. As a shield its shape is somewhere between a pavise and a kite shield.

David, as the heroic shepherd boy who killed the huge Goliath, was already a patriotic symbol for the Republic of Florence, which saw itself as threatened by much larger neighbouring powers. Of famous Florentine representations of David, the two statues, in marble and bronze by Donatello had already been made, and Michelangelo's larger than life David came some 50 years later.

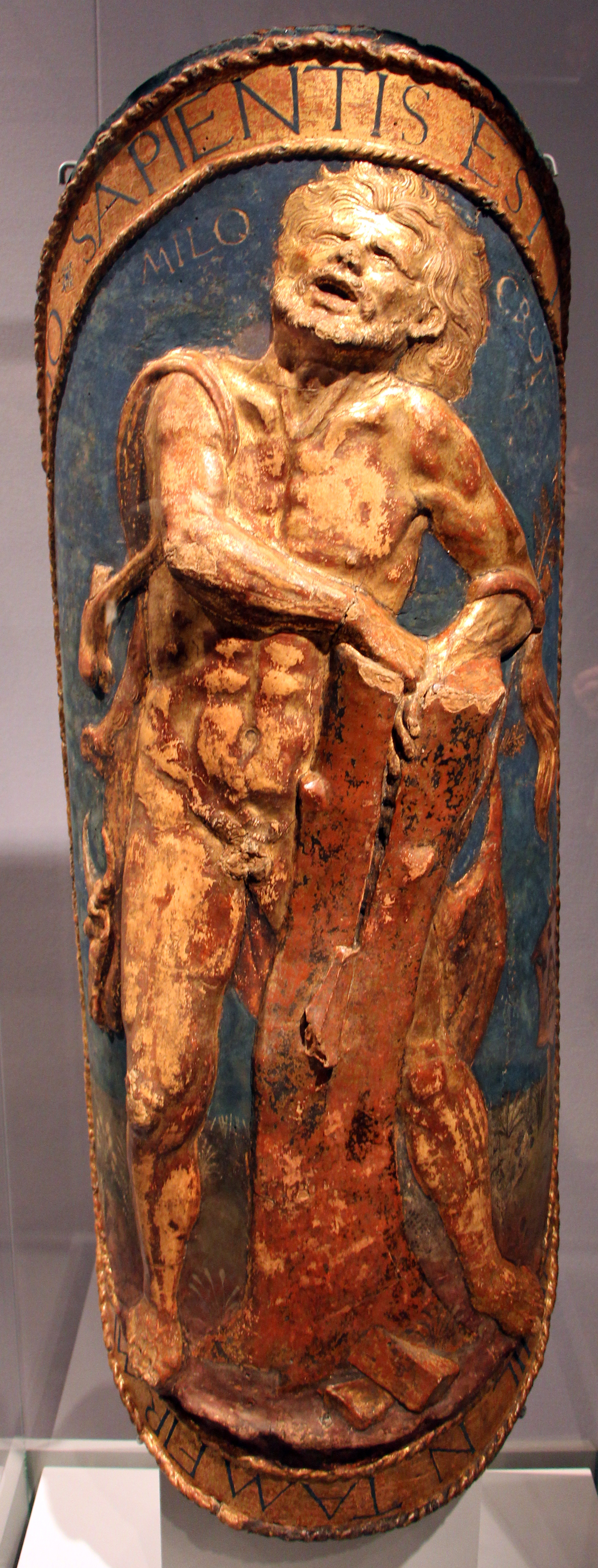
Antonio del Pollaiolo, Shield with Milo of Croton, 1460–1465

In the following decade Antonio del Pollaiolo made a shield with a plaster figure of Milo of Croton, painted in gold, now in the Louvre. Such expensive pieces as these were presumably hung in the owner's home when not being used in civic parades and processions. Later there were extravagant parade shields in metal, such as the Ghisi Shield in the Waddesdon Bequest in the British Museum.
