= Portrait of a Man (Castagno) =

Painting by Andrea del Castagno

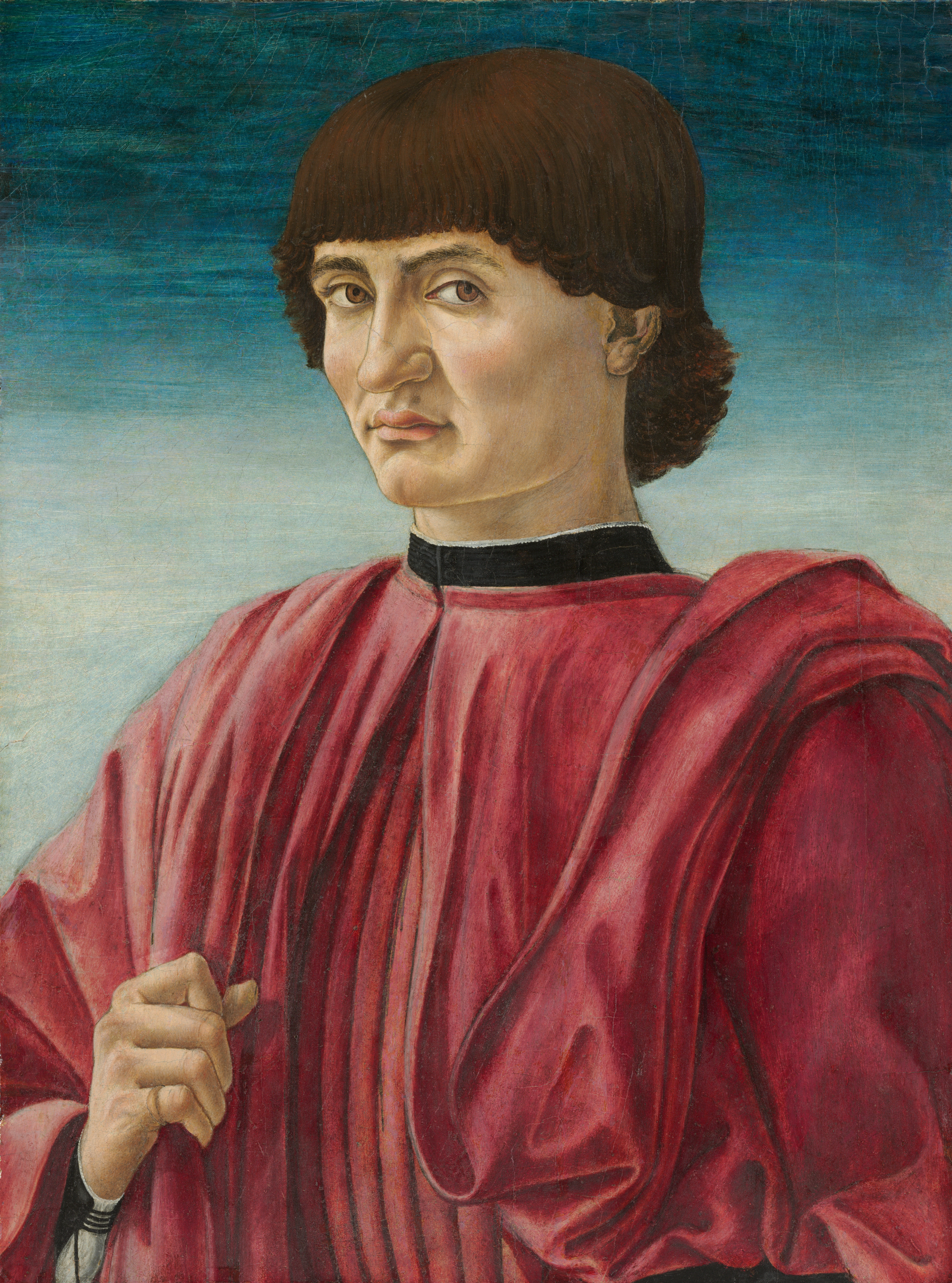
Portrait of a Man (c. 1450–1457) by Andrea del Castagno

Portrait of a Man is a tempera-on-panel painting by the Italian painter Andrea del Castagno, created c. 1450–1457, depicting an unknown man. It is held in the National Gallery of Art in Washington, DC. It was featured on the third series of 10,000 lira Italian banknotes, in circulation from 1976 to 1984.

It probably originally formed part of the Del Nero family collection in Florence, which merged with the Torrigiani family and its collections in the 18th century. It was recorded as being at the Palazzo Torrigiani-Del Nero in the 19th century, from which it was bought by Charles Fairfax Murray, who placed it on the Parisian art market. In 1907, J. Pierpont Morgan bought it and took it to New York, where in 1935, his son sold it to Andrew W. Mellon, who bequeathed it to its present owner.
