= Legnaia =

Quarter in Borough 4 of Florence

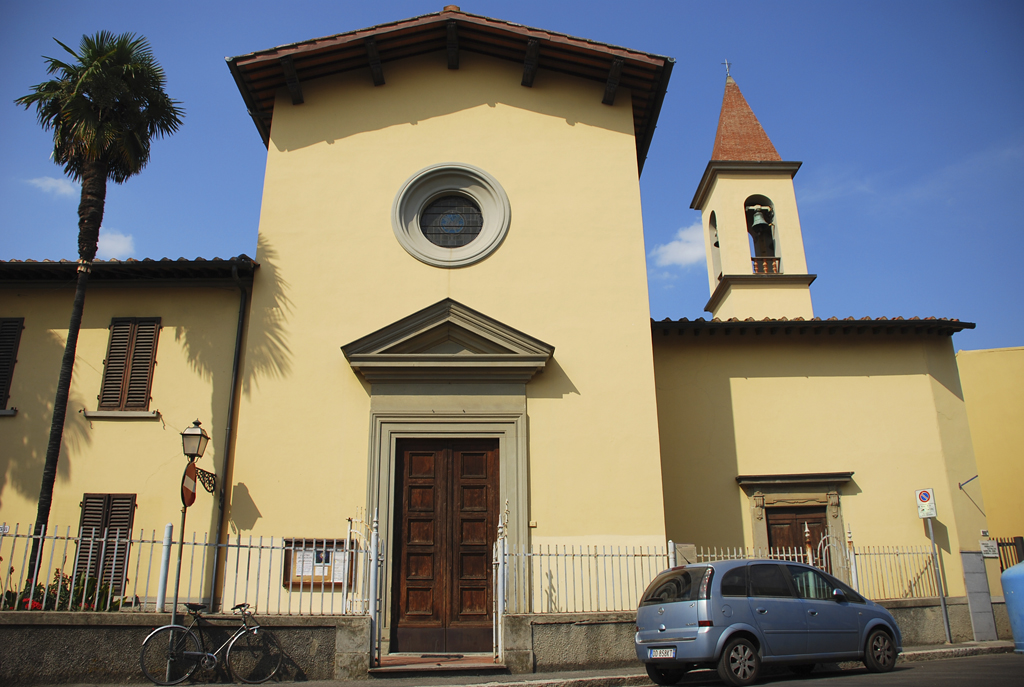
The church of San Quirico a Legnaia.

Legnaia is a rione (historical district) in Florence, Italy. It is located between the centre of the city and Scandicci, and was an autonomous commune from 1808 (when it was detached from Galluzzo by then French occupation forces) until 1865. At the time, it counted some 11,300 inhabitants.

It houses the Villa Carducci-Pandolfini with Andrea Castagno frescoes. Among the churches are San Quirico a Legnaia and Sant'Angelo a Legnaia.
