= Last Supper (Castagno) =

Fresco by Andrea del Castagno

Coordinates: 43.778669°N 11.256569°E

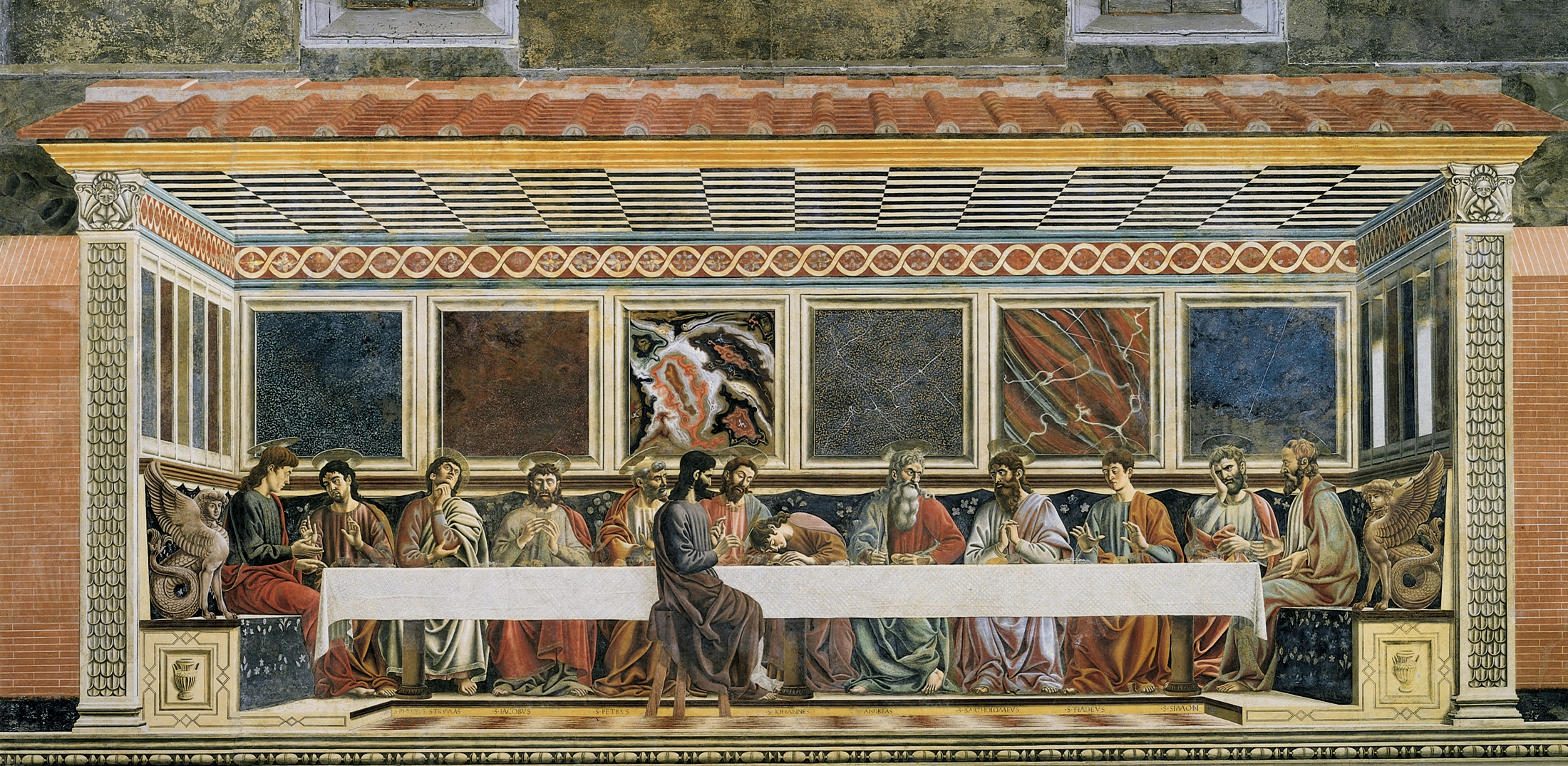
- Artist: Andrea del Castagno
- Year: 1445–1450
- Type: Fresco
- Dimensions: 453 cm × 975 cm (178 in × 384 in)
- Location: Sant'Apollonia; Florence

The Last Supper (1445–1450) is a fresco by the Italian Renaissance artist Andrea del Castagno, located in the refectory of the convent of Sant'Apollonia, now the Museo di Cenacolo di Sant'Apollonia, and accessed through a door on Via Ventisette Aprile at the corner with Santa Reparata, in Florence, region of Tuscany. The painting depicts Jesus and the Apostles during the Last Supper, with Judas, unlike all the other apostles, sitting separately on the near side of the table, as is common in depictions of the Last Supper in Christian art.

Sant'Apollonia was a Benedictine convent of cloistered nuns, and Castagno's fresco was not publicly known until the convent was suppressed in 1866: Vasari, for example, seems not to have known of the painting. Thus its exclusively female audience should be considered in analyzing the work. Castagno painted a large chamber with life-sized figures that confronted the nuns at every meal. The fresco would have served as a didactic image and an inspiration to meditation on their relationship with Jesus. Painted with a careful attention to naturalistic detail—a sense of real space and light, seemingly tangible details of the setting, and lifelike figures—the work must have spoken forcefully of the continued significance of the Eucharistic meal in their own world.

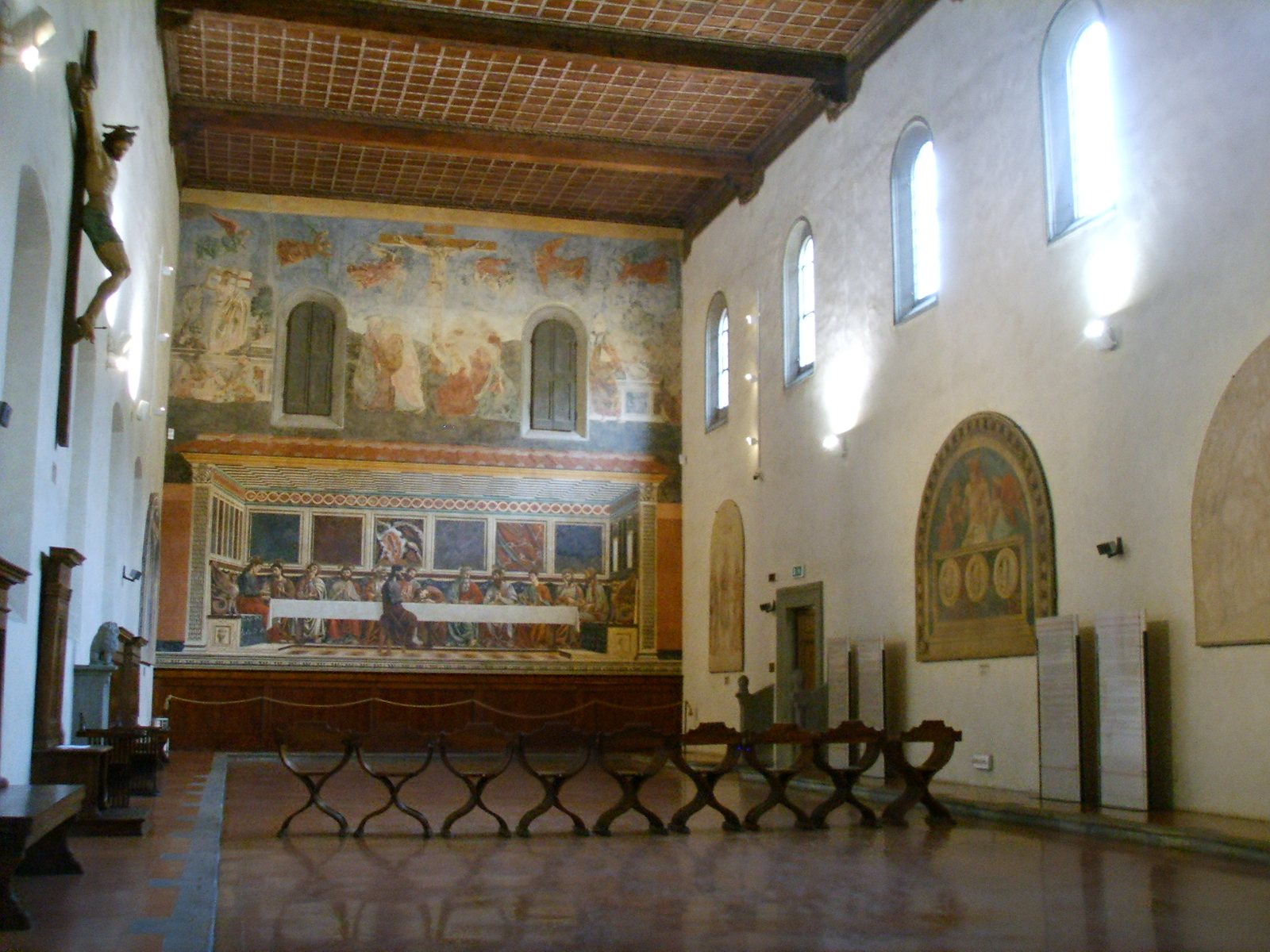
Refectory of Sant'Apollonia

== Description ==
Although the Last Supper is described in all four Gospels, Castagno's fresco seems most closely aligned with the account in the Gospel of John, in which eleven of the apostles are confused and the devil "enters" Judas when Jesus announces one of his followers will betray him. Saint John's posture of innocent slumber neatly contrasts with Judas's tense, upright pose and exaggeratedly pointed facial features. Except for Judas, Christ and his apostles, including the recumbent St John, all have a translucent disc of a halo above their heads.

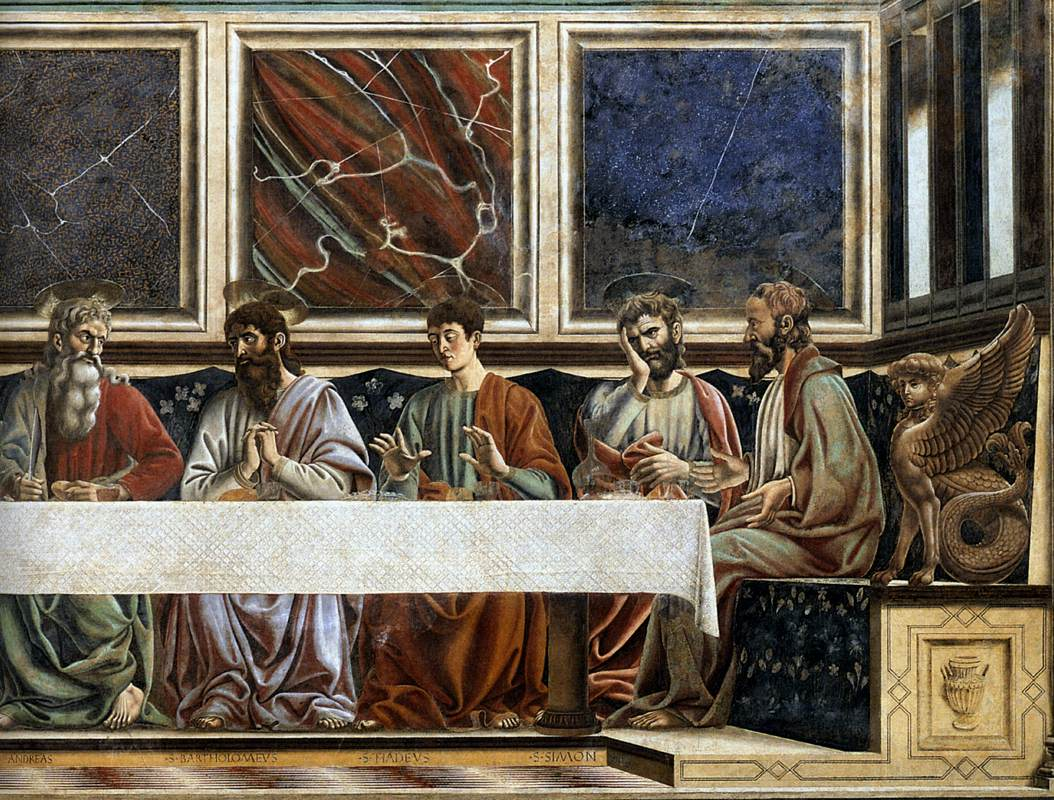
Andrea del Castagno, Sant'apollonia

The fresco is notable for its detail and naturalism. The colors of the apostles' robes and their postures contribute to the balance of the piece. The highly detailed marble walls hearken back to Roman "First Style" wall paintings, and the pillars and griffon statues recall Classical sculpture and trompe-l'œil painting. The halos are depicted in perspective.

The Last Supper was a major work by Andrea del Castagno and his studio. The quality of figures and details is uneven; the right hand of St Peter appears to be replaced by a left hand. Some figures have a remote detachment from emotion, typical of early High Renaissance style, and exemplified by the style of Piero della Francesca. This work, located in the refectory of a convent of cloistered nuns, may have been seen by Leonardo da Vinci before he painted his own far more emotional Last Supper.

The fresco is in an excellent state of conservation, in part because it remained behind a plaster wall for more than a century. The contemporary fresco by Castagno on the top register, not protected, shows more degradation, and depicts the Crucifixion, flanked by the Resurrection and Burial of Christ.
