= Assumption of the Virgin Between St Minias and St Julian =

Painting by Andrea del Castagno

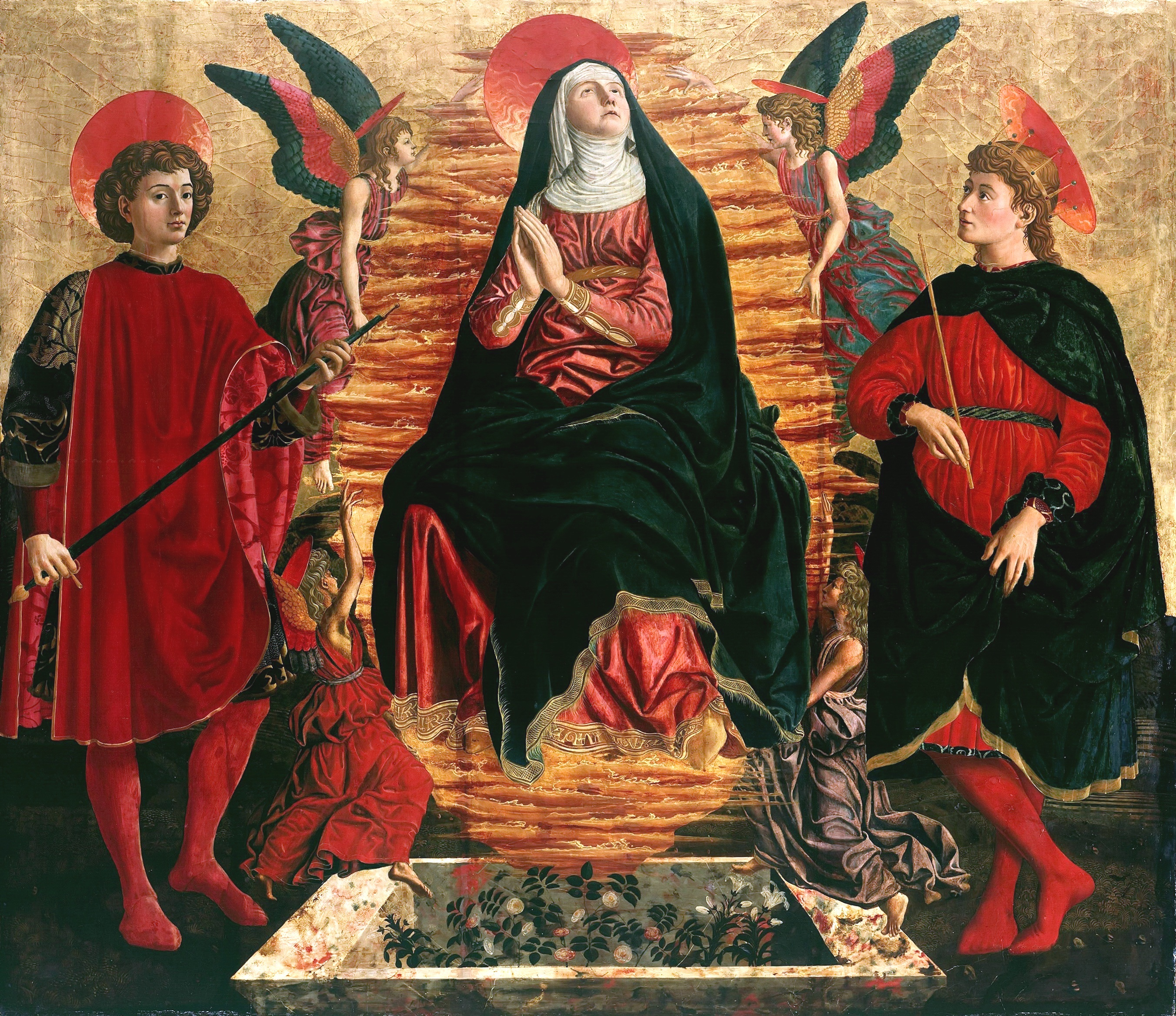
- Artist: Andrea del Castagno
- Year: 1449–1450
- Type: Tempera and gold on panel
- Dimensions: 150 cm × 158 cm (59 in × 62 in)
- Location: Gemäldegalerie; Berlin

The Assumption of the Virgin Between St Minias and St Julian is a painting by the Italian early Renaissance master Andrea del Castagno, executed around 1449–1450. It is now housed in the Gemäldegalerie of Berlin.

== History ==
An inscription mentioned by Filippo Baldinucci, dated 20 November 1449, reported that the altarpiece was commissioned by Leonardo di Francesco di Nardo Falladanzi, the rector of San Miniato tra le Torri, a church in Florence. Falladanzi kept a notebook in which he noted that he paid "maestro Andrea, pintore" 104 lire for an altarpiece for the main altar of the church.

The church was demolished around 1888 (it was located where the main post office is today), and its heritage was dispersed, after which Andrea del Castagno's Assumption was acquired by Berlin's Gemäldegalerie.

== Description ==
The painting portrays Mary in a wide blue cloak, while she is lifted up from a sepulchre depicted in perspective. The cloak, as typical in Andrea del Castagno, is painted with a heavy use of chiaroscuro. The sepulchre contains roses, a flower usually associated with the Virgin. She is carried within a brilliant mandorla by four angels.

At Mary's sides are St. Julian (left, with a sword) and St. Minias of Florence (right, with a stick and a crown). While the Virgin is portrayed in a realistic posture, the two saints have a more static appearance. Both men are elegantly dressed in the most expensive of contemporary costumes. Not only the damask fabrics, but also the saturated red color indicate the costliness of their garments.

The background is in gold leaf.

== Sources ==
- Paolieri, Annarita (1991). Paolo Uccello, Domenico Veneziano, Andrea del Castagno. Florence: Scala.
