= Villa Carducci-Pandolfini =

Historical building

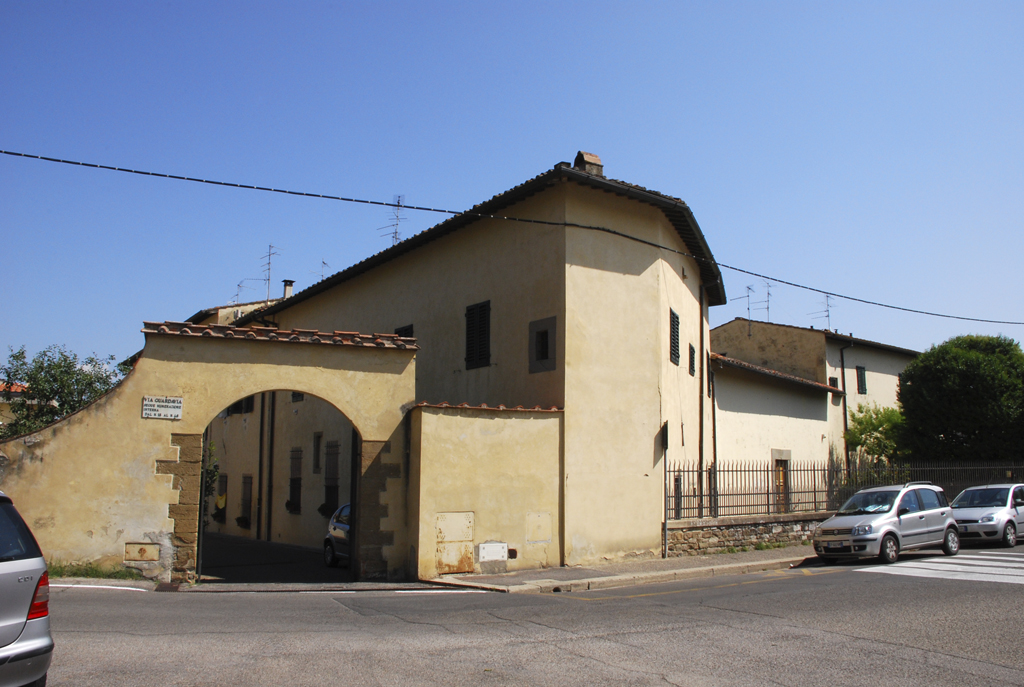
Villa Carducci di Legnaia or Villa Carducci-Pandolfini, Florence, Italy

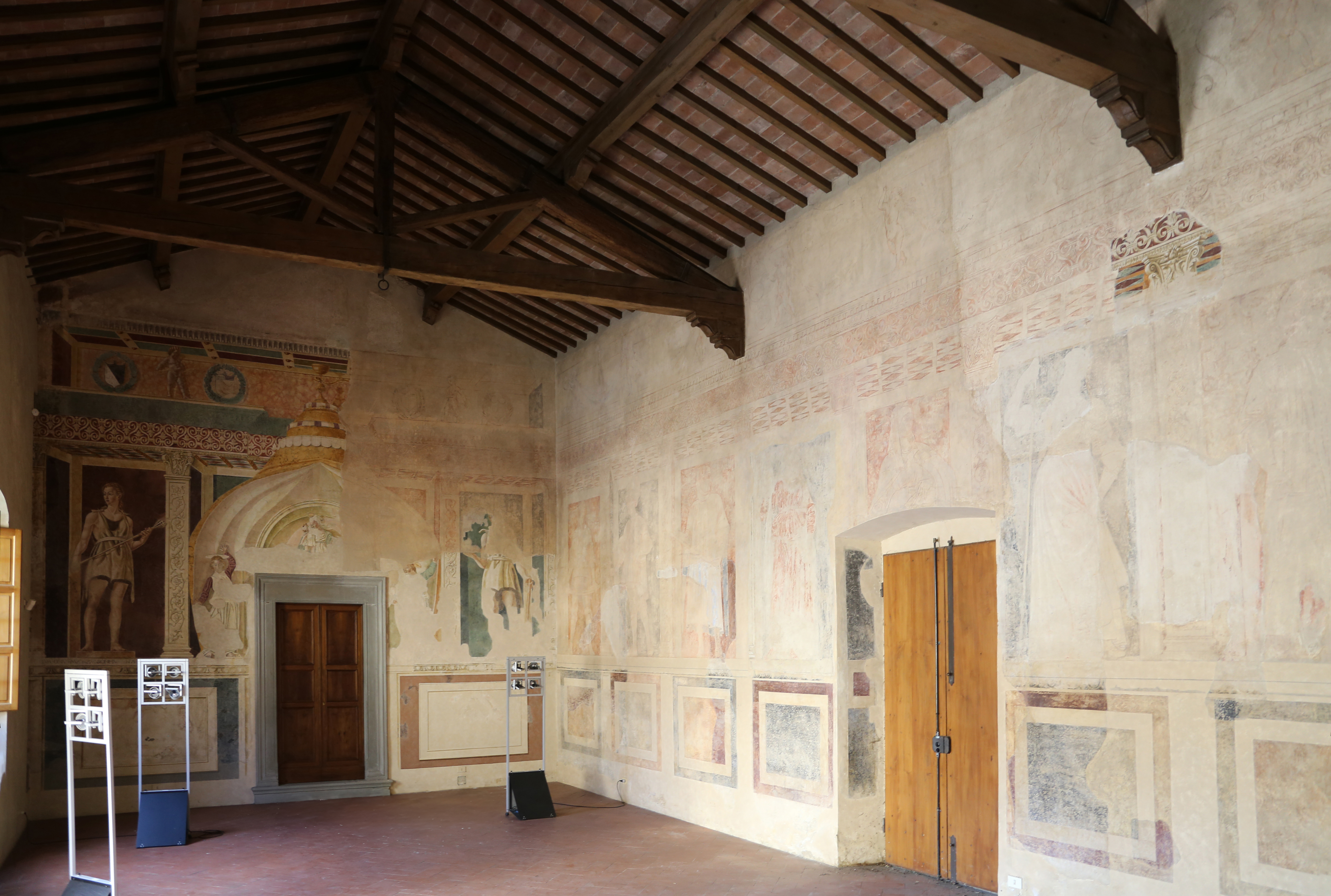
The Hall of Famous Men and Women

The Villa Carducci-Pandolfini is a historic rural palace located on Via Guardavia, on the road between Legnaia and Soffiano. It is located in the town limits of Legnaia. The property is now part of Polo Museale of Tuscany, and open only by appointment.

The 15th-century fortified villa encloses a 14th-century tower. It is best known for its fresco of Illustrious Men and Women painted in 1455 by Andrea del Castagno for a loggia. Rediscovered in 1847, the frescoes were detached and exhibited in Florence. Moved after the flood, they are now stored in the Galleria degli Uffizi. The frescoes depict:

- Pippo Spano (Florentine condottiero under Emperor Sigismond fighting Saracens)
- Farinata degli Uberti (Florentine Ghibelline captain)
- Niccolò Acciaioli (Founder of the Certosa del Galluzzo)
- Cumaean Sybil
- Queen Esther
- Queen Tomyris (Active in battle against Cyrus the Great)
- Dante Alighieri
- Petrarch
- Giovanni Boccaccio

Presently some of the rooms retain frescoes (1472) in situ depicting the Madonna and Child, Adam and Eve and various putti and garlands.
