= Saint Julian the Hospitaller with Christ the Redeemer =

Painting by Andrea del Castagno

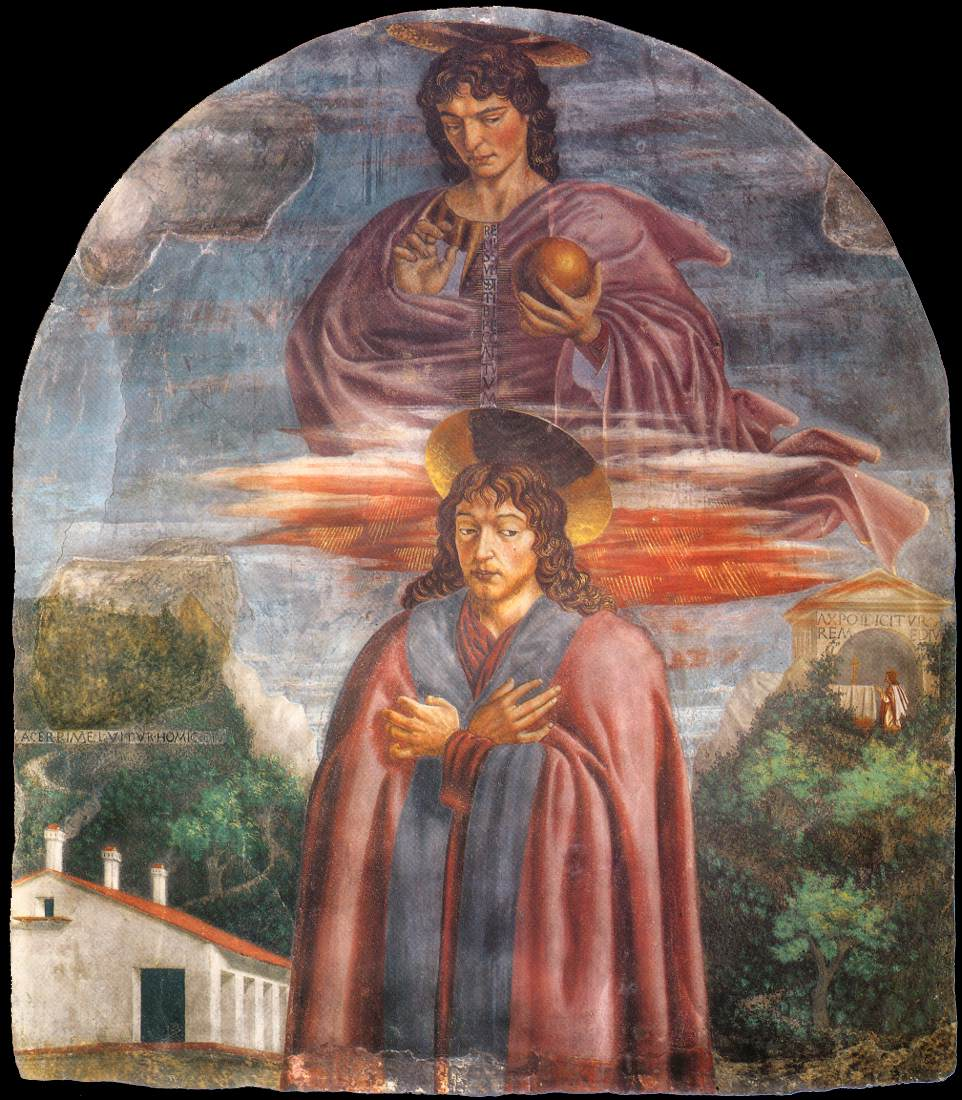
Saint Julian the Hospitaller with Christ the Redeemer (1451) by Andrea del Castagno

Saint Julian the Hospitaller with Christ the Redeemer is a fresco by Andrea del Castagno in the Feroni Chapel of Santissima Annunziata, Florence. Usually hidden behind an altarpiece by Carlo Loth since 1692, it was painted in 1451 on the construction of the church's five chapels. The Altarpiece was removed carelessly in 1857, damaging the bottom of the fresco, probably consisting of scenes from Julian the Hospitaller's life described in Vasari's Lives of the Artists as executed "with a good number of figures and an escaped dog, which was highly praised".
