= Andrea del Castagno =

Italian Renaissance painter (c. 1419–1457)

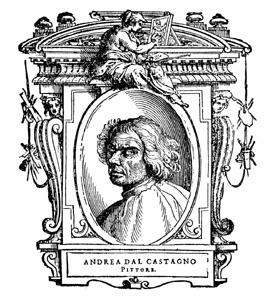
- Portrait of Andrea del Castagno in the Lives by Vasari (1568)
- Born: c. 1419; Castagno, near Florence, Republic of Florence
- Died: 19 August 1457 (aged 37–38); Florence, Republic of Florence
- Movement: Italian Renaissance painting

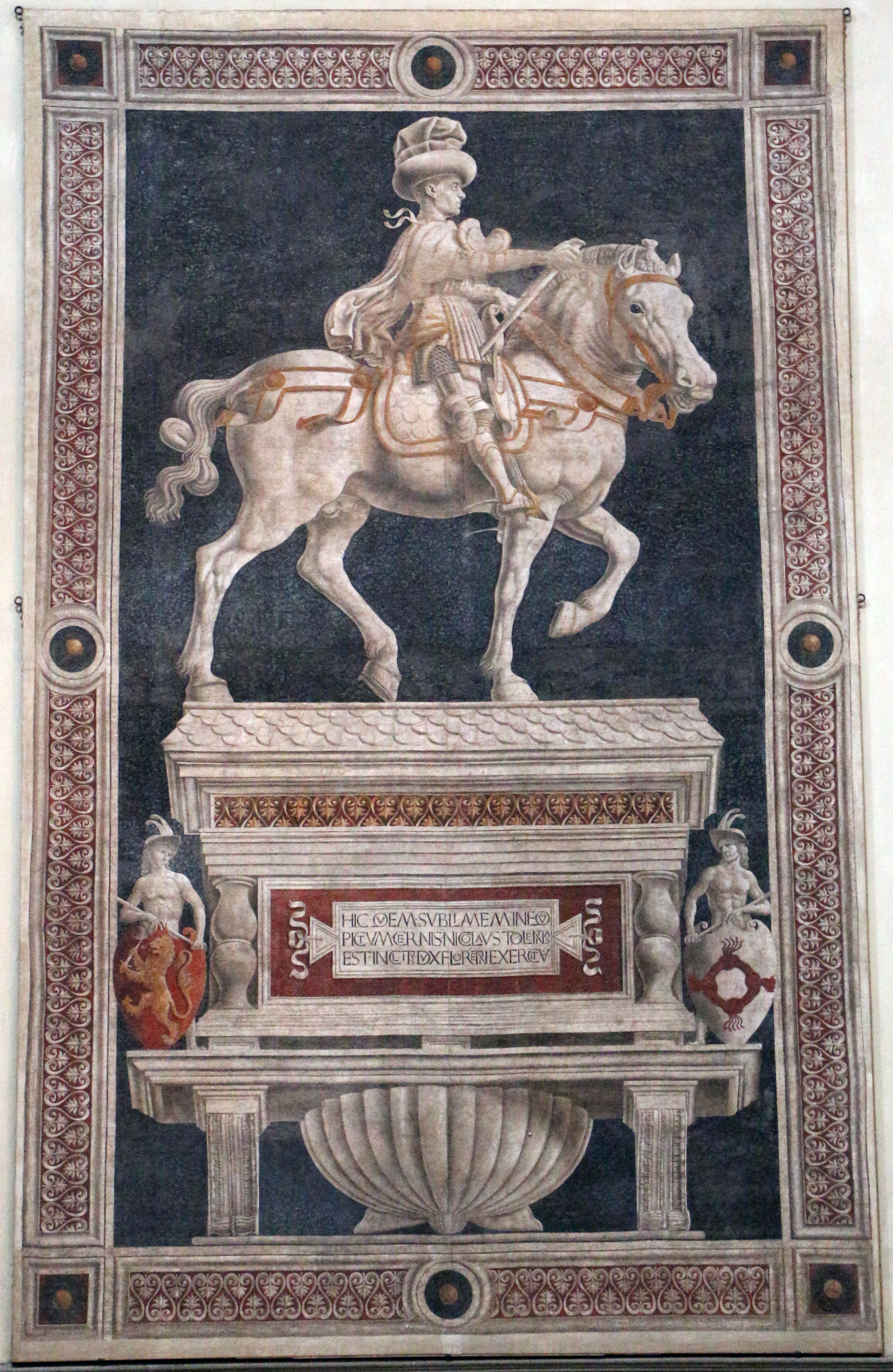
Equestrian Monument of Niccolò da Tolentino (1456)

Andrea del Castagno (Italian: [anˈdrɛːa del kaˈstaɲɲo]; c. 1419 – 19 August 1457), also known patronymically as Andrea di Bartolo di Bargilla (pronounced [anˈdrɛːa di ˈbartolo di barˈdʒilla]), was an Italian Renaissance painter in Florence, influenced chiefly by Masaccio and Giotto di Bondone. His works include frescoes in Sant'Apollonia in Florence and the painted equestrian monument of Niccolò da Tolentino (1456) in Florence Cathedral. He in turn influenced the Ferrarese school of Cosmè Tura, Francesco del Cossa and Ercole de' Roberti.

== Life ==
=== Early years ===
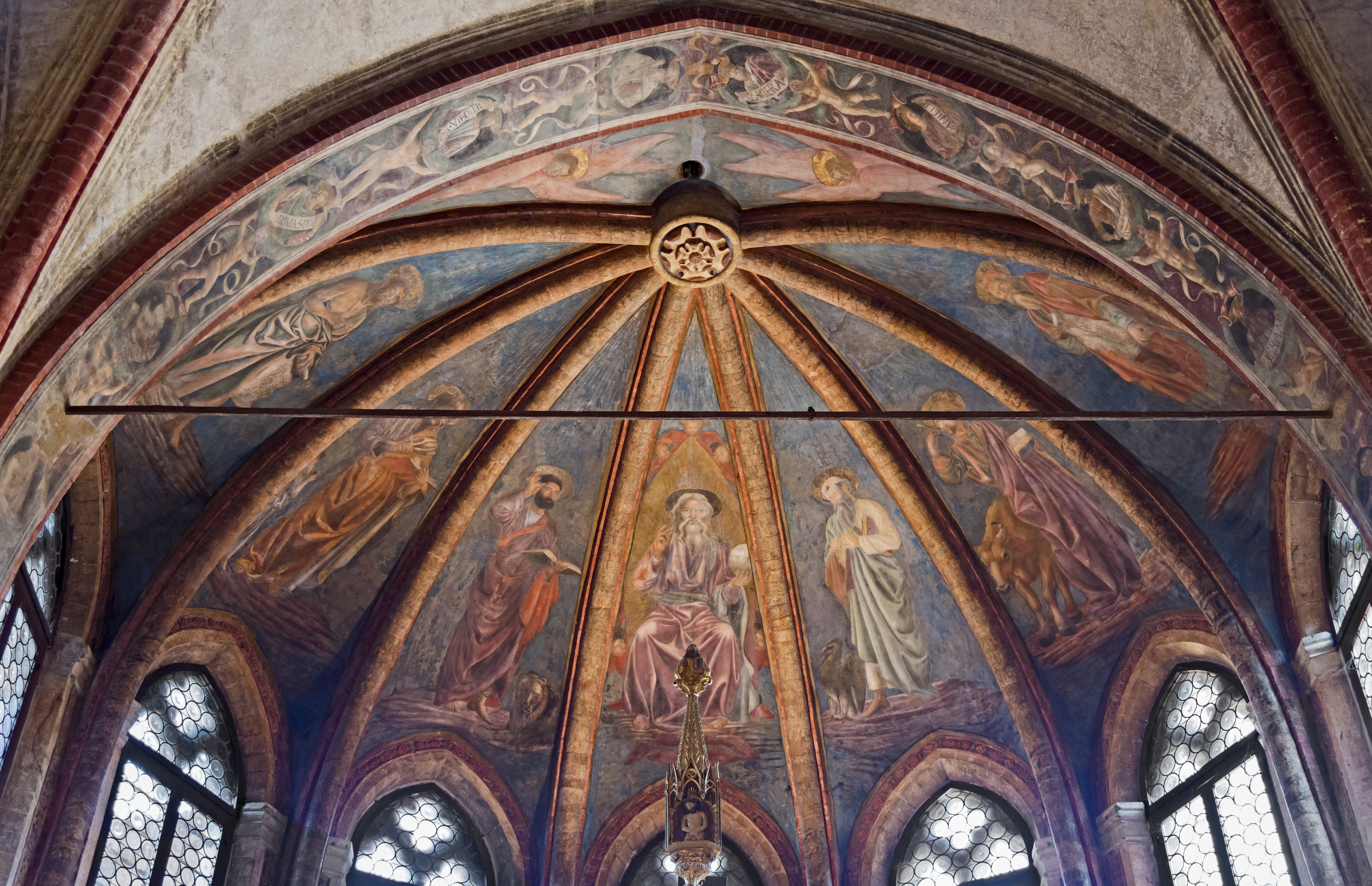
Frescoes in the San Tarasio Chapel, San Zaccaria

Andrea del Castagno was born at Castagno, a village near Monte Falterona, not far from Florence. During the war between Florence and Milan, he lived in Corella, returning to his home after its end. In 1440 he moved to Florence under the protection of Bernadetto de' Medici. Here he painted the portraits of the citizens hanged after the Battle of Anghiari on the facade of the Palazzo del Podestà, gaining the nickname of Andrea degli Impiccati.

Little is known about his training, though it has been hypothesised that he apprenticed under Fra Filippo Lippi and Paolo Uccello. In 1440–1441 he executed the fresco of the Crucifixion with Saints in the Hospital of Santa Maria Nuova, whose perspective-oriented construction and figures show the influence of Masaccio.

In 1442 he was in Venice where he executed frescoes in the San Tarasio Chapel of the church of San Zaccaria. Later he also worked in St Mark's Basilica, leaving a fresco of the Death of the Virgin (1442–1443).

Back in Florence, he designed a stained window depicting the Deposition for the Duomo. On 30 May 1445 he became a member of the Guild of the Medicians. From the same year is the fresco of Madonna and Child with Saints in the Contini Bonacossi Collection (Uffizi).

=== The Last Supper ===
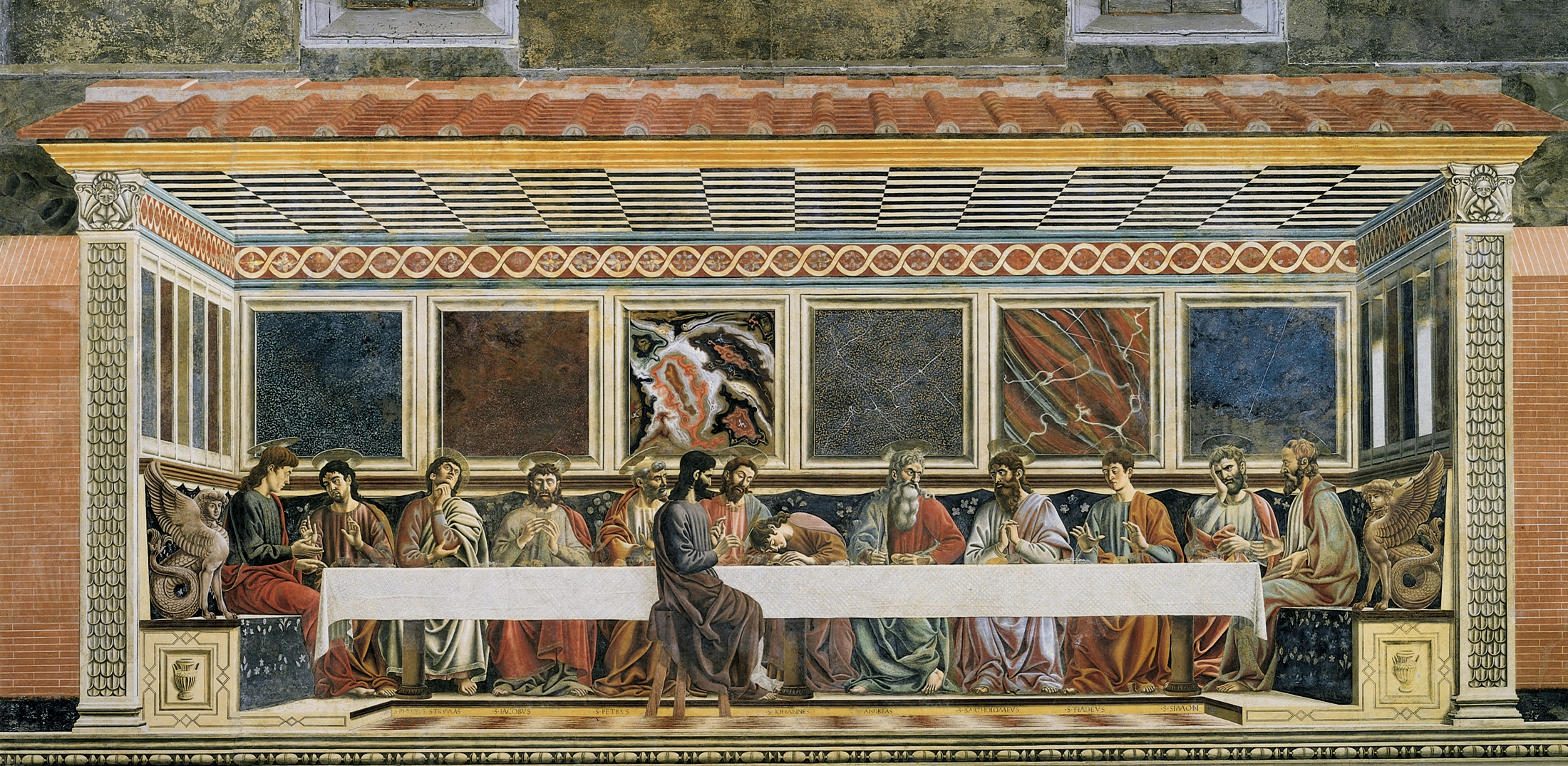
The Last Supper of Sant'Apollonia

In 1447 Castagno worked in the refectory of the Benedictine nuns at Sant'Apollonia in Florence, painting, in the lower part, a fresco of the Last Supper, accompanied above by other scenes portraying the Passion of Christ: the Crucifixion, Entombment, and Resurrection, which are now damaged. This combination of scenes is not known to have been represented before. He also painted a lunette in the convent's cloister, depicting a Pietà. Many important Florentine families had daughters in the convent at Sant'Apollonia, so painting there probably brought Andrea to their attention.

The Last Supper displays Andrea del Castagno's talents at their best. The detail and naturalism of this fresco show the ways in which he departed from earlier artistic styles. It is likely that Leonardo da Vinci was already familiar with this work before he painted his own Last Supper in a more dramatic form to contrast with the stillness of these works, so that more emotion would be displayed.

=== Late activity ===
In 1449–1450 he painted the Assumption with Saints Julian and Miniato for the main altar (in the Saint Julian Chapel) of the church of San Miniato fra le Torri in Florence (now in Berlin).

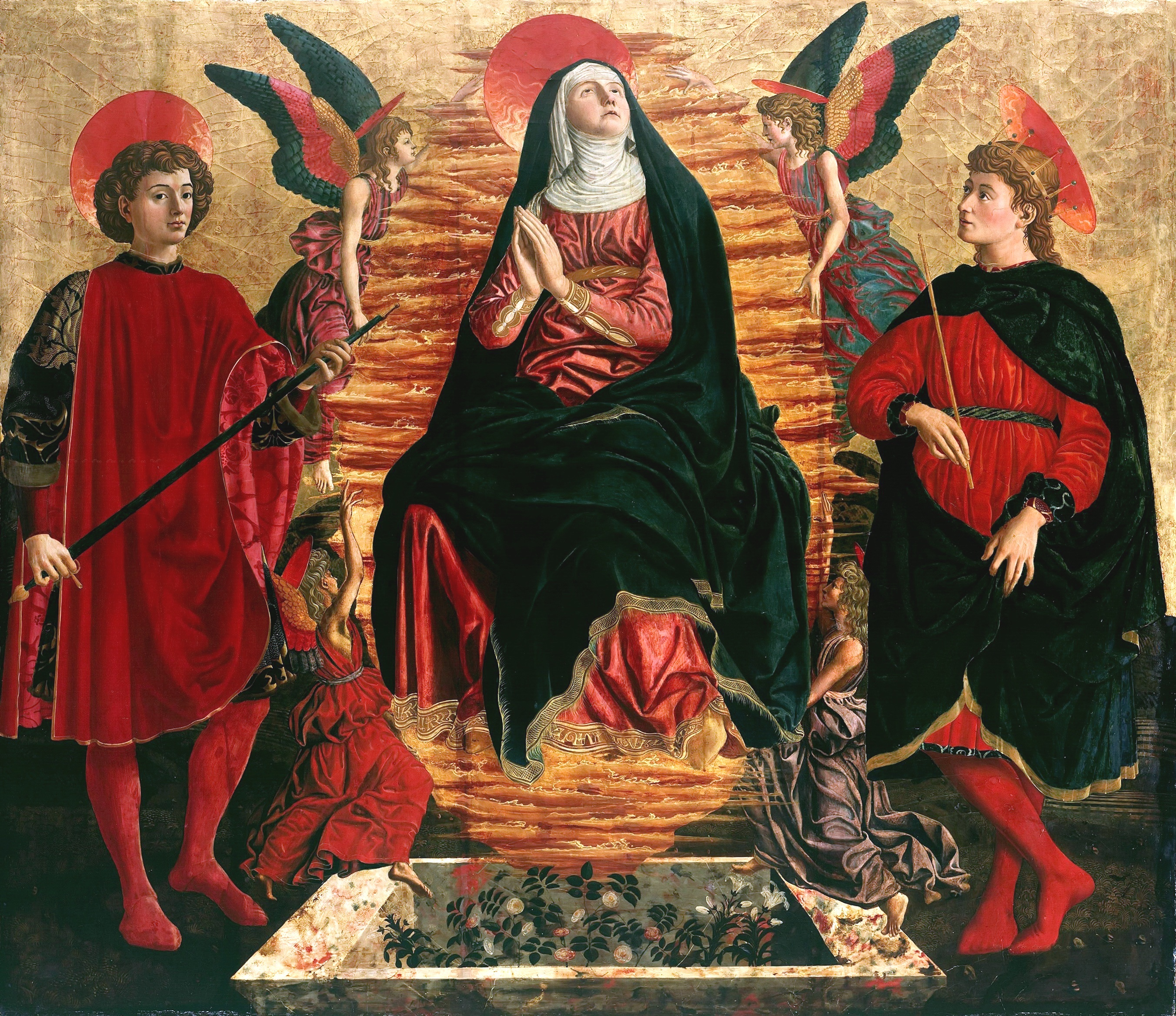
Assumption of the Virgin

In the same years he collaborated with Filippo Carducci to paint a series of Illustrious People for the Villa Carducci at Legnaia. These include Pippo Spano, Farinata degli Uberti, Niccolò Acciaioli, Dante Alighieri, Petrarch, Giovanni Boccaccio, the Cumaean Sibyl, Esther and Tomyris.

Also from around 1450 is the Crucifixion in London, as well as the David with the Head of Goliath and the Portrait of a Man, both in Washington.

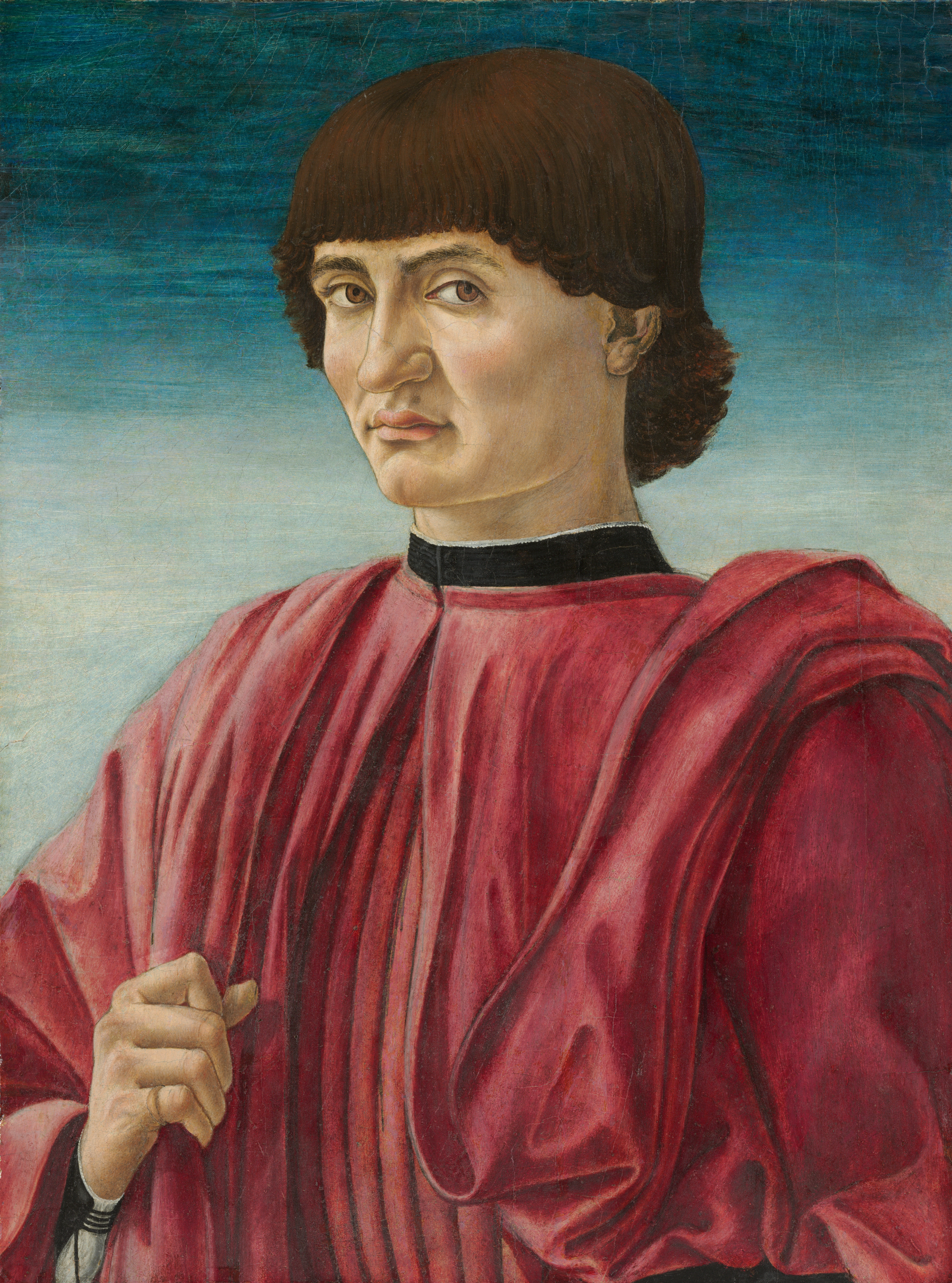
Portrait of a Man

Between January 1451 and September 1453 he completed the frescoes of Scenes of the Life of the Virgin left unfinished by Domenico Veneziano in the church of Sant'Egidio, Florence (now lost). In October Filippo Carducci commissioned him to paint frescoes for his villa at Soffiano, of which today an Eve and a ruined Madonna with Child survive.

In 1455 Andrea del Castagno worked in the Basilica della Santissima Annunziata (frescoes with the Trinity with Saints Jerome, Paula and Eustochium and Saint Julian and the Redeemer, the former showing a stressed realism). A Crucifixion for Sant'Apollonia from those years is also attributed to him. In 1456 he executed the fresco of the Equestrian Monument of Niccolò da Tolentino in the Duomo of Florence, paralleling the similar painting by Paolo Uccello portraying Sir John Hawkwood.

== Supposed murderer ==
Giorgio Vasari, an artist and biographer of the Italian Renaissance, alleged that Castagno murdered the artist Domenico Veneziano, but this is impossible, since Veneziano died in 1461, four years after Castagno died of the plague. It has been suggested that Vasari was confusing this murder case with another one involving a "Domenico di Matteo" who was killed by an "Andreino" in 1448, but the archival record shows that this is a misreading: "A cursory examination reveals two things: first, that the name of the dead painter is not Domenico di Matteo, but Domenico di Marco; and second, and much more crucially, that there is no mention of him having been killed by a painter named Andrea or Andreino." However, this wholly false story coloured Castagno's reputation for centuries. The sinister portrait engraving (apparently entirely invented) that prefaced his Life in the second edition of Vasari's Lives reflects this.

== Gallery ==
From the series of Illustrious People for the Villa Carducci-Pandolfini

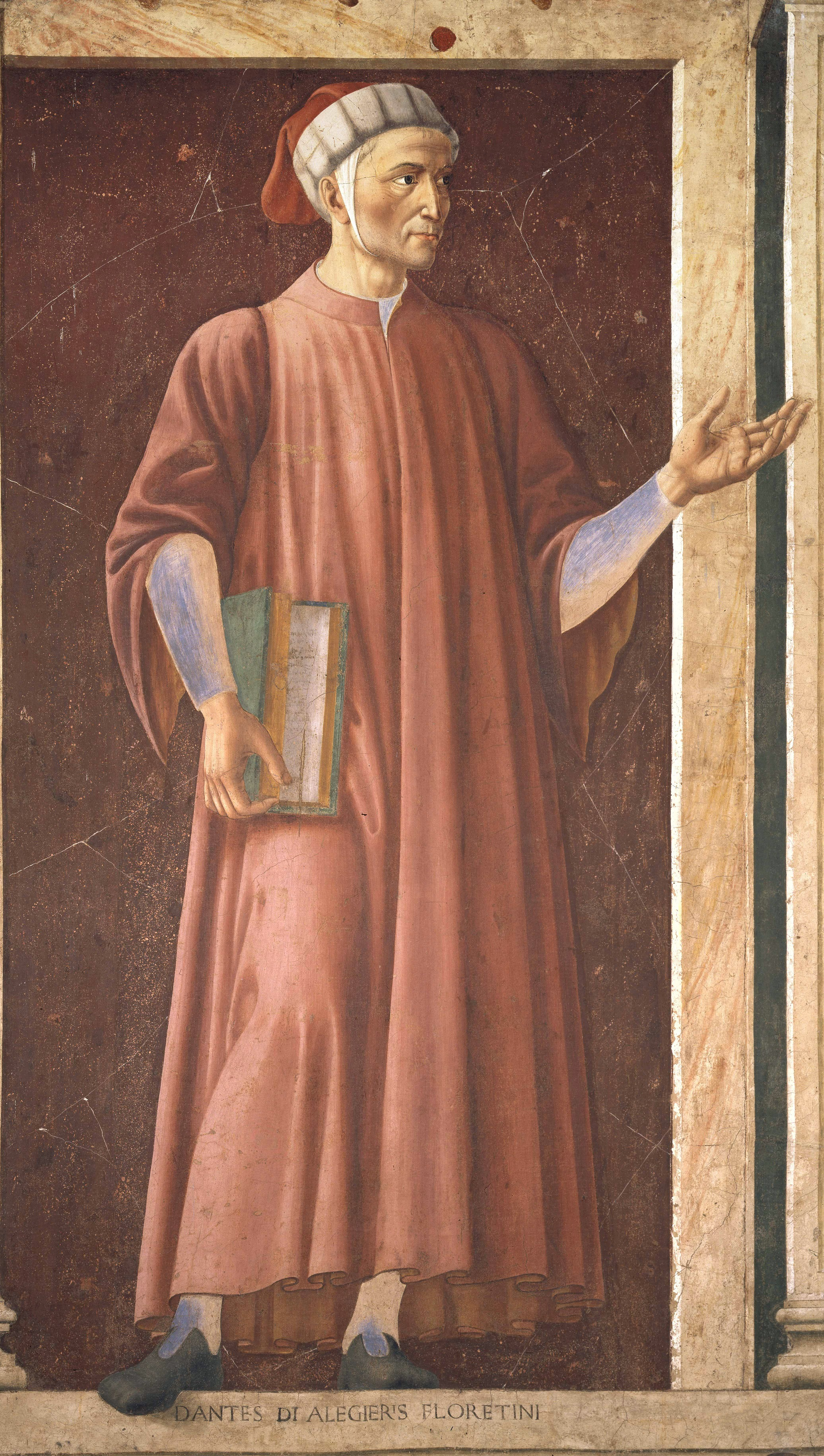
Dante

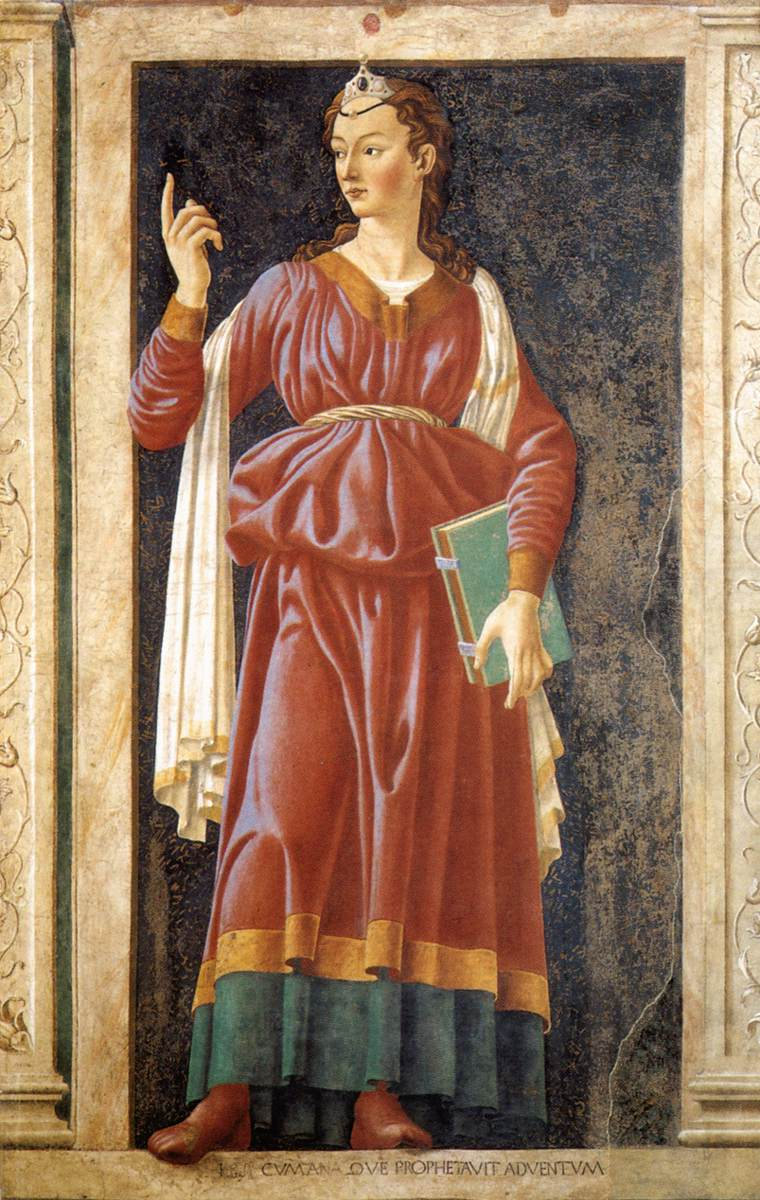
Cumaean Sibyl

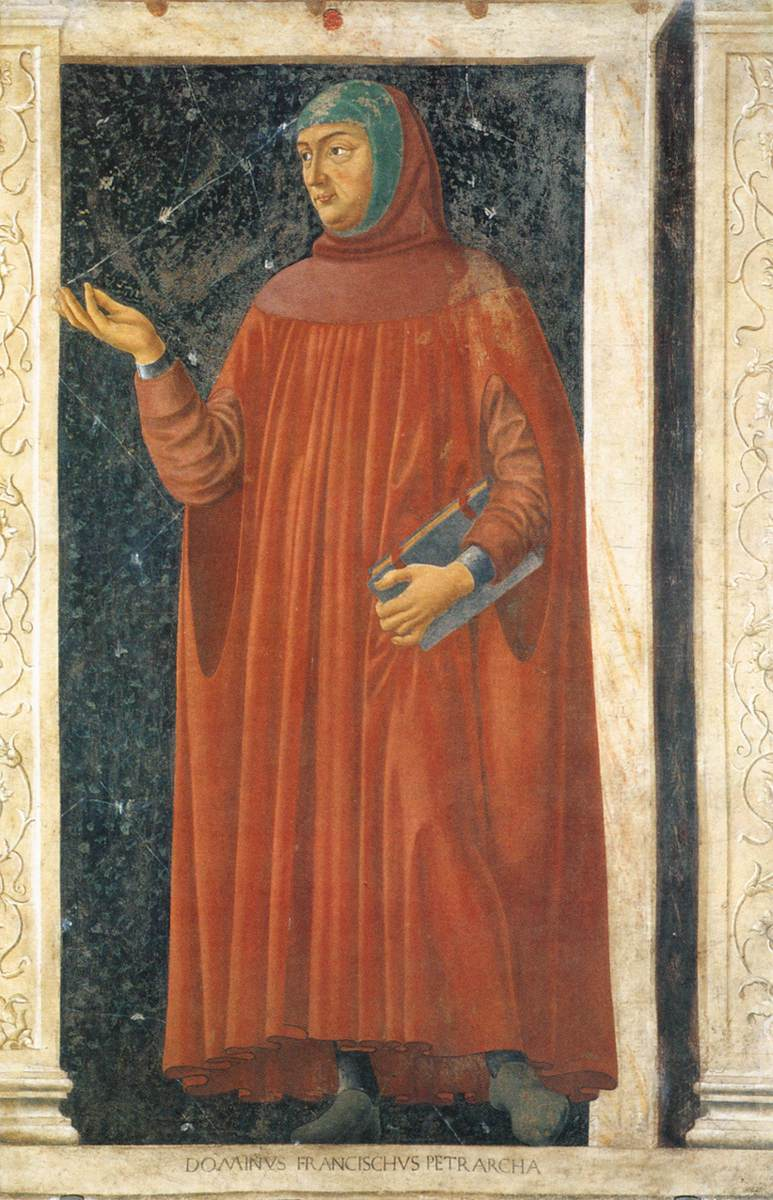
Petrarch

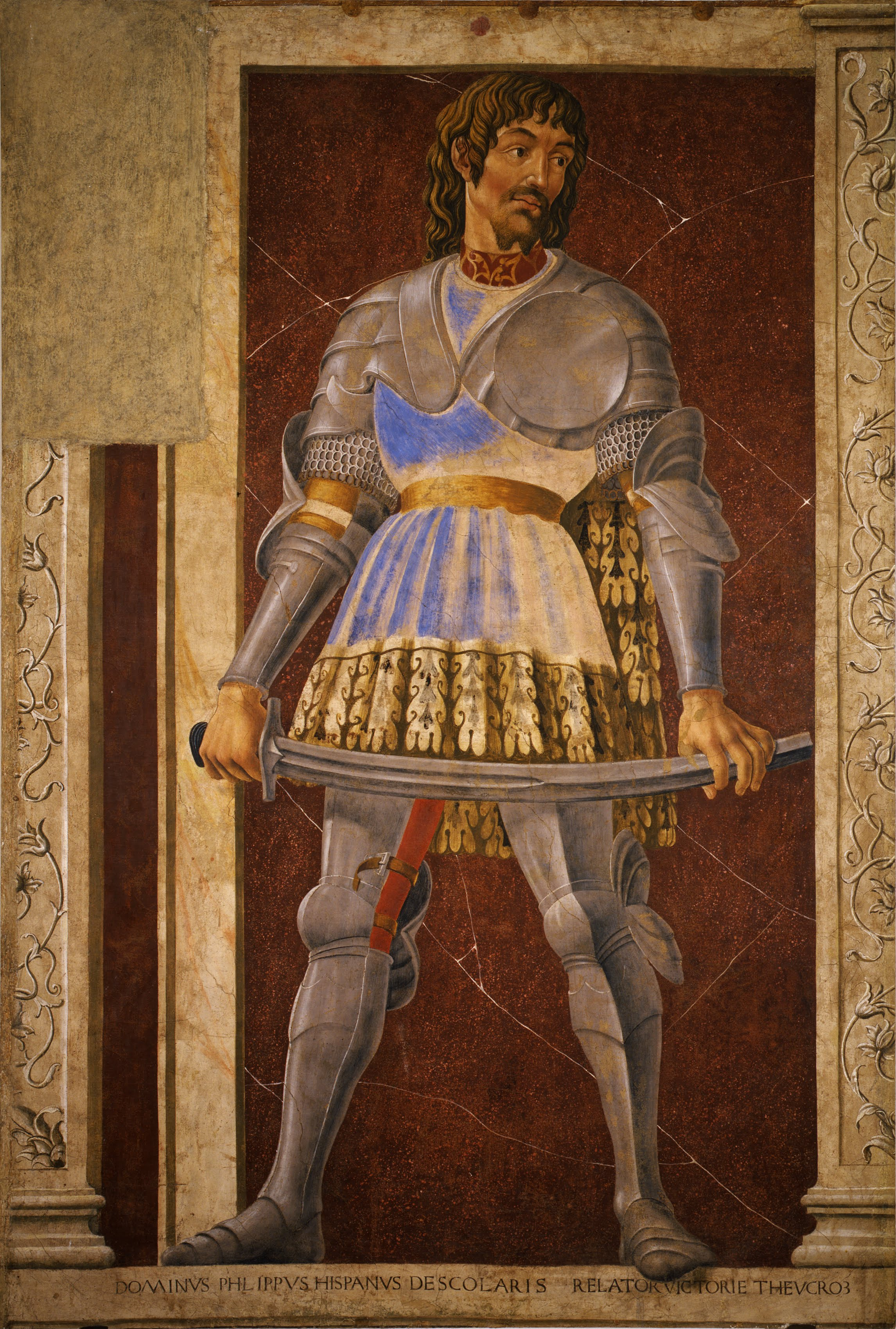
Condottiere Pippo Spano

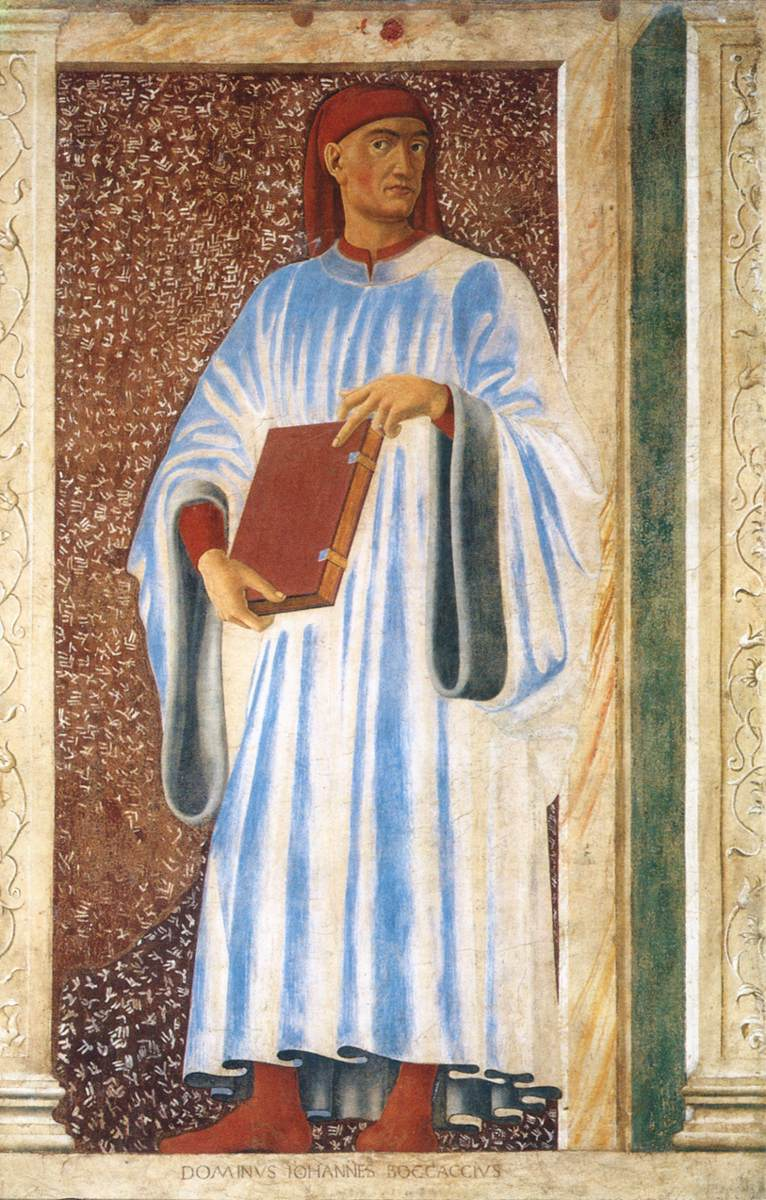
Giovanni Boccaccio

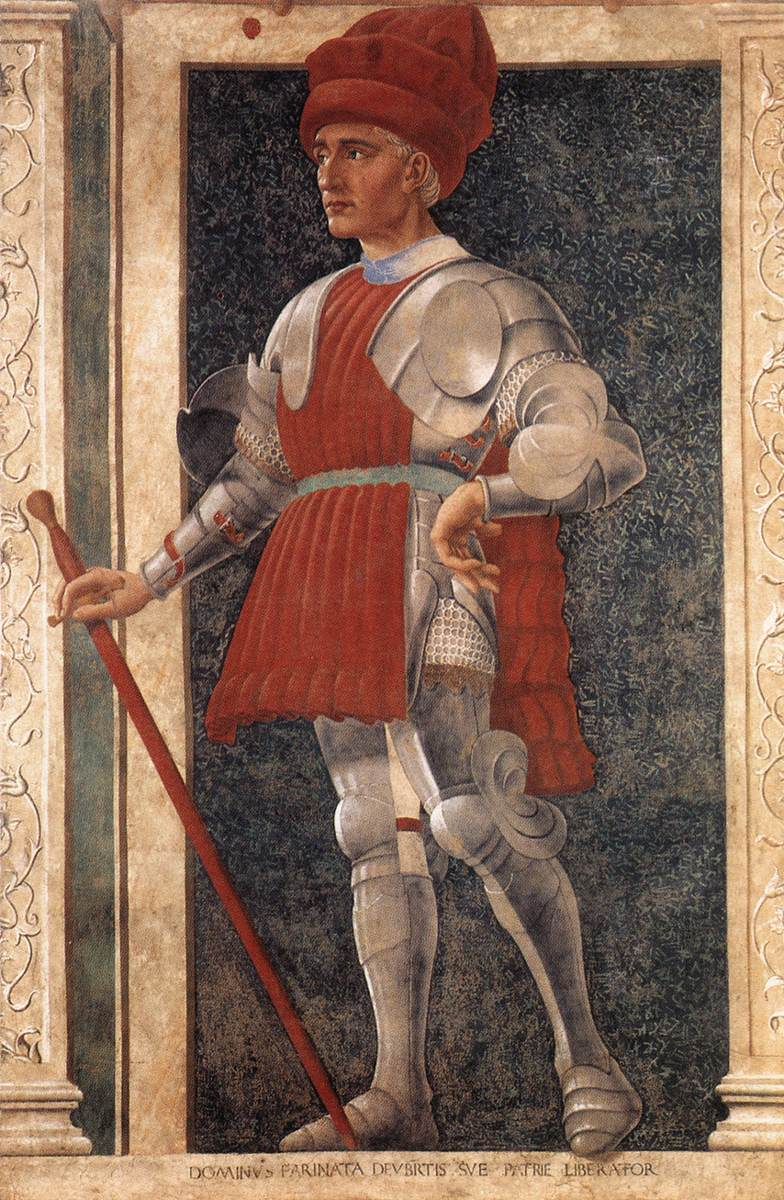
Farinata degli Uberti

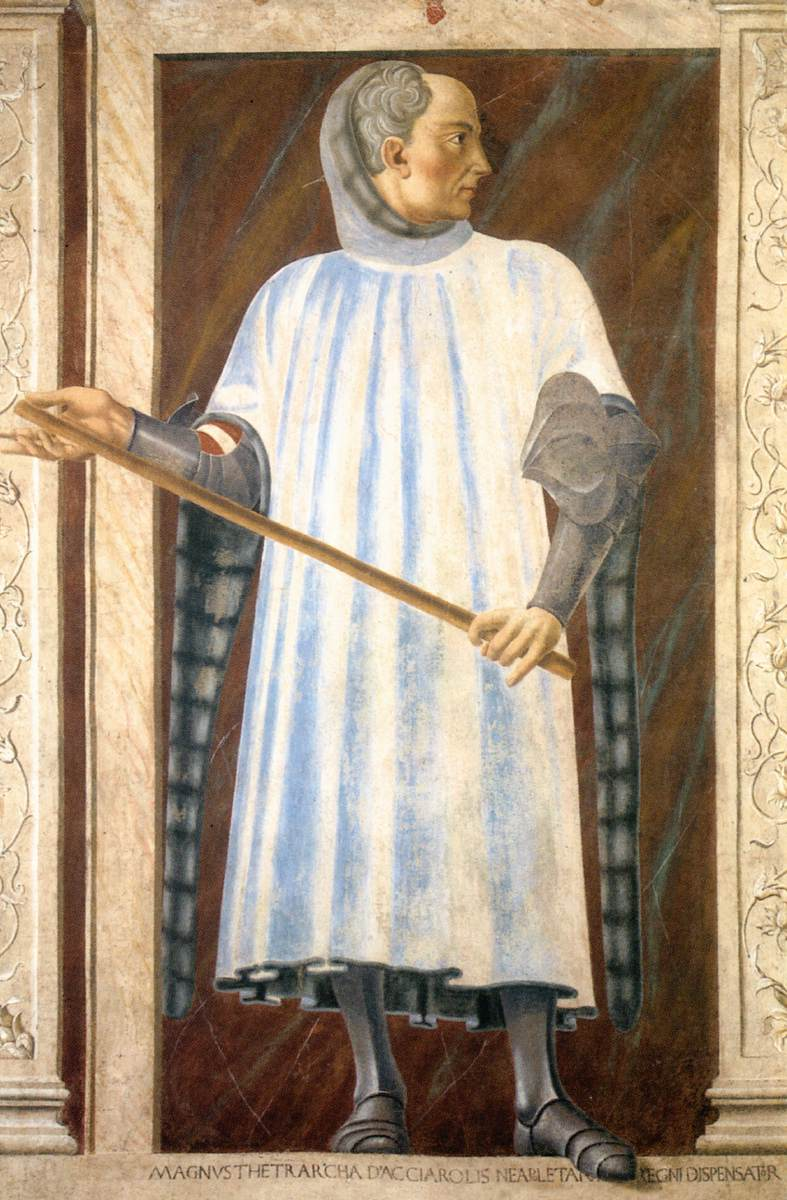
Niccolò Acciaioli

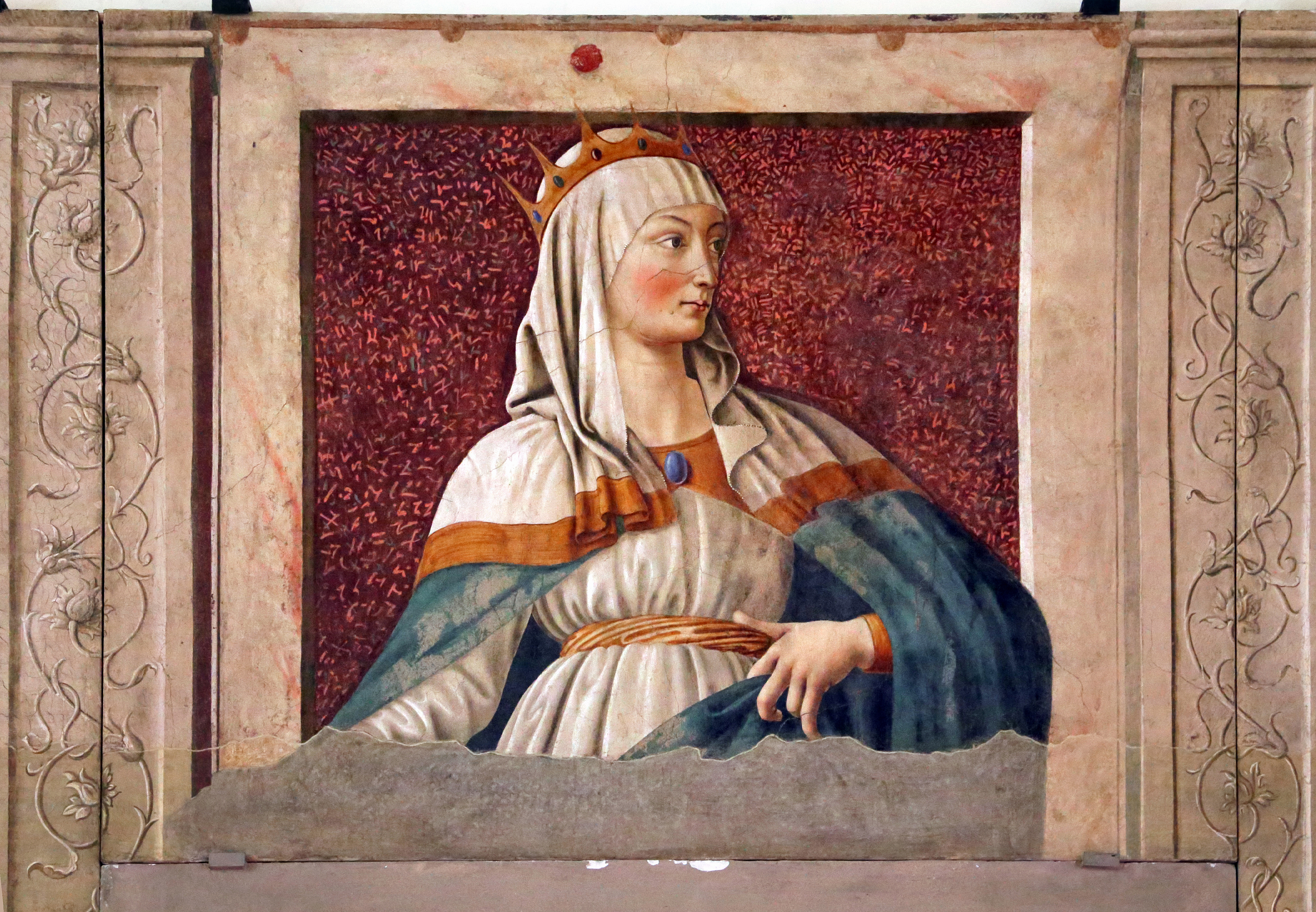
Queen Esther

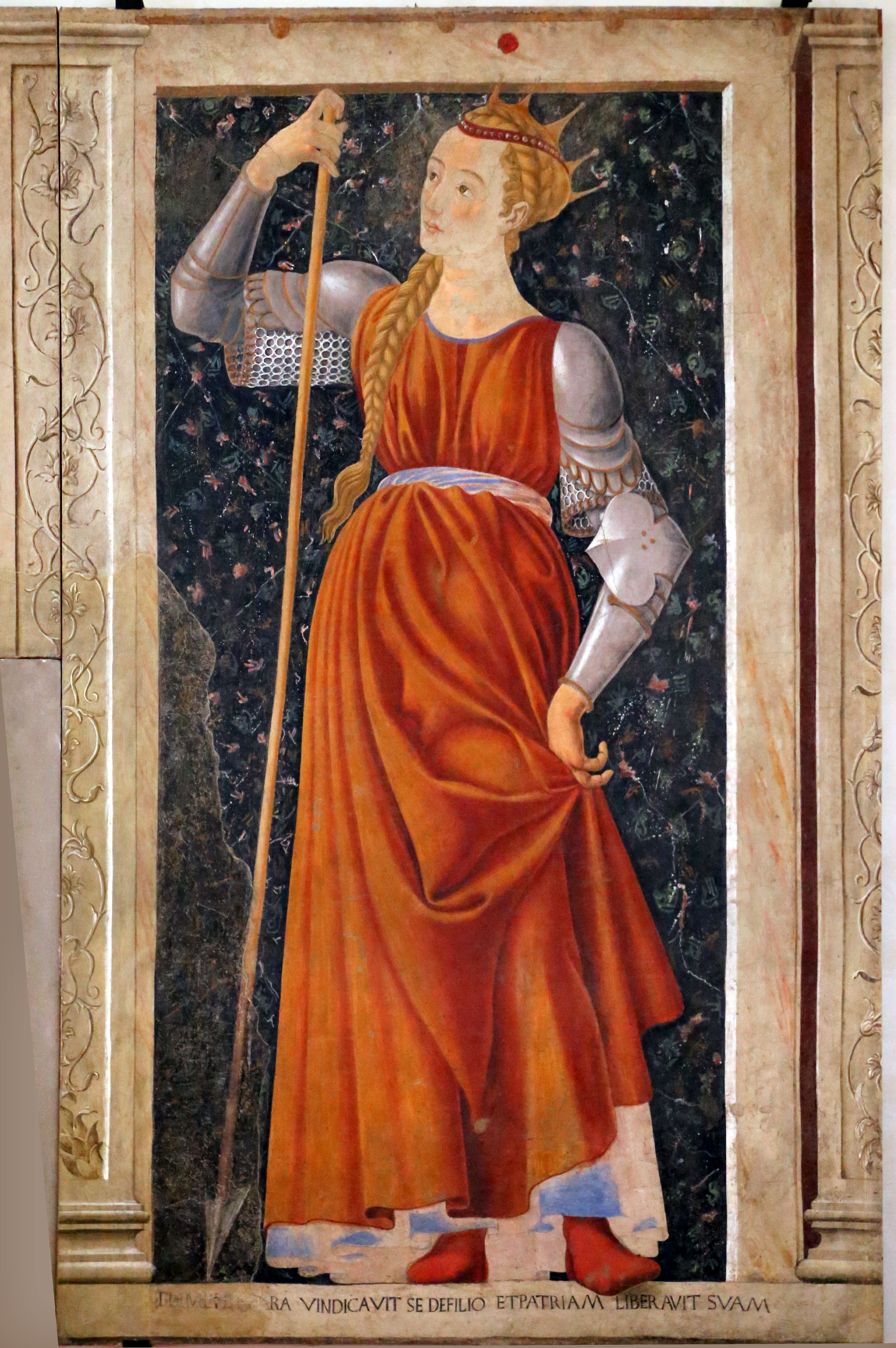
Queen Tomyris

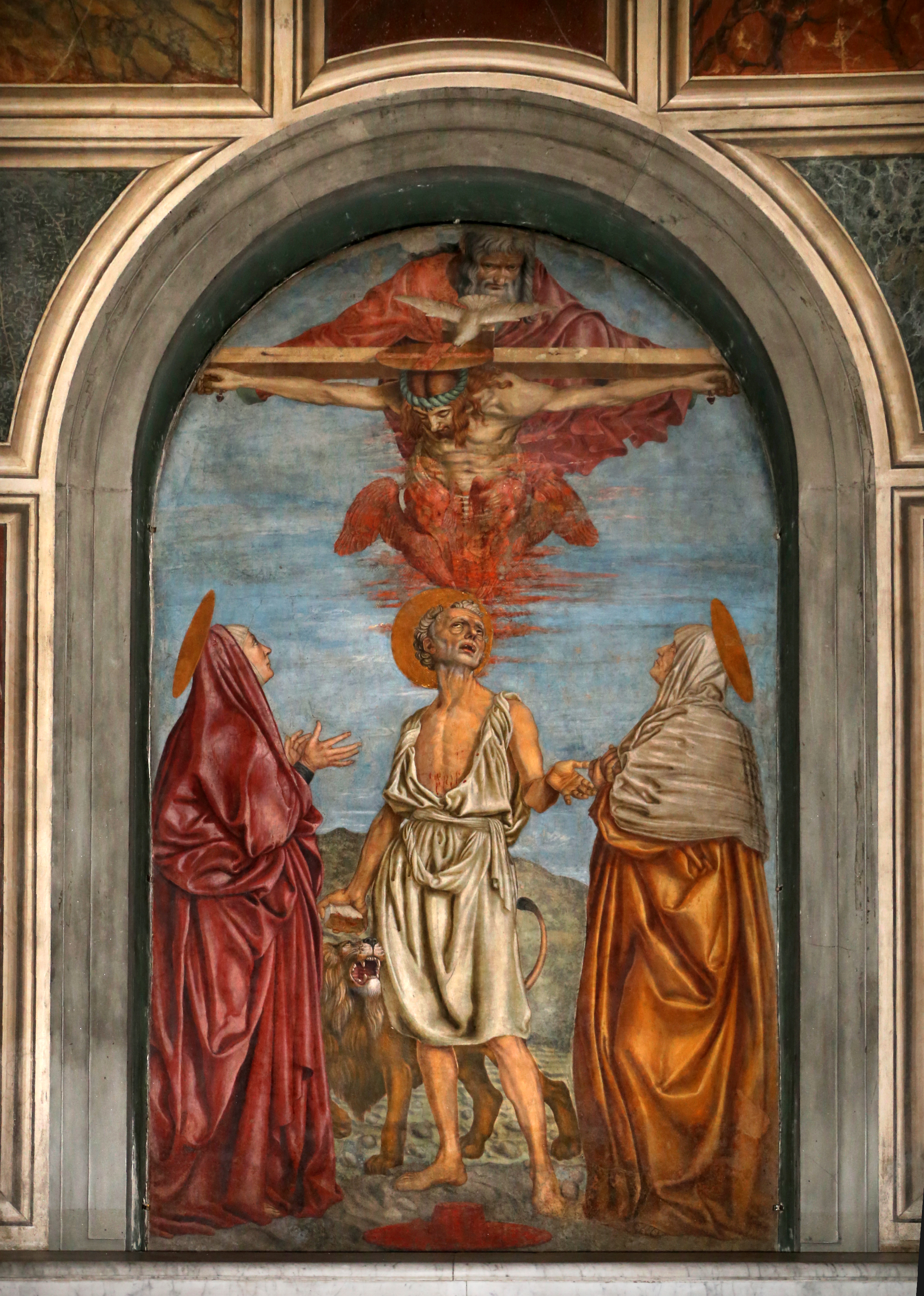
Trinity with Saints Jerome, Paula and Eustochium, Basilica della Santissima Annunziata, Florence, fresco
