= Sant'Apollonia =

Benedictine convent in Florence, Italy

Coordinates: 43.778668°N 11.256569°E

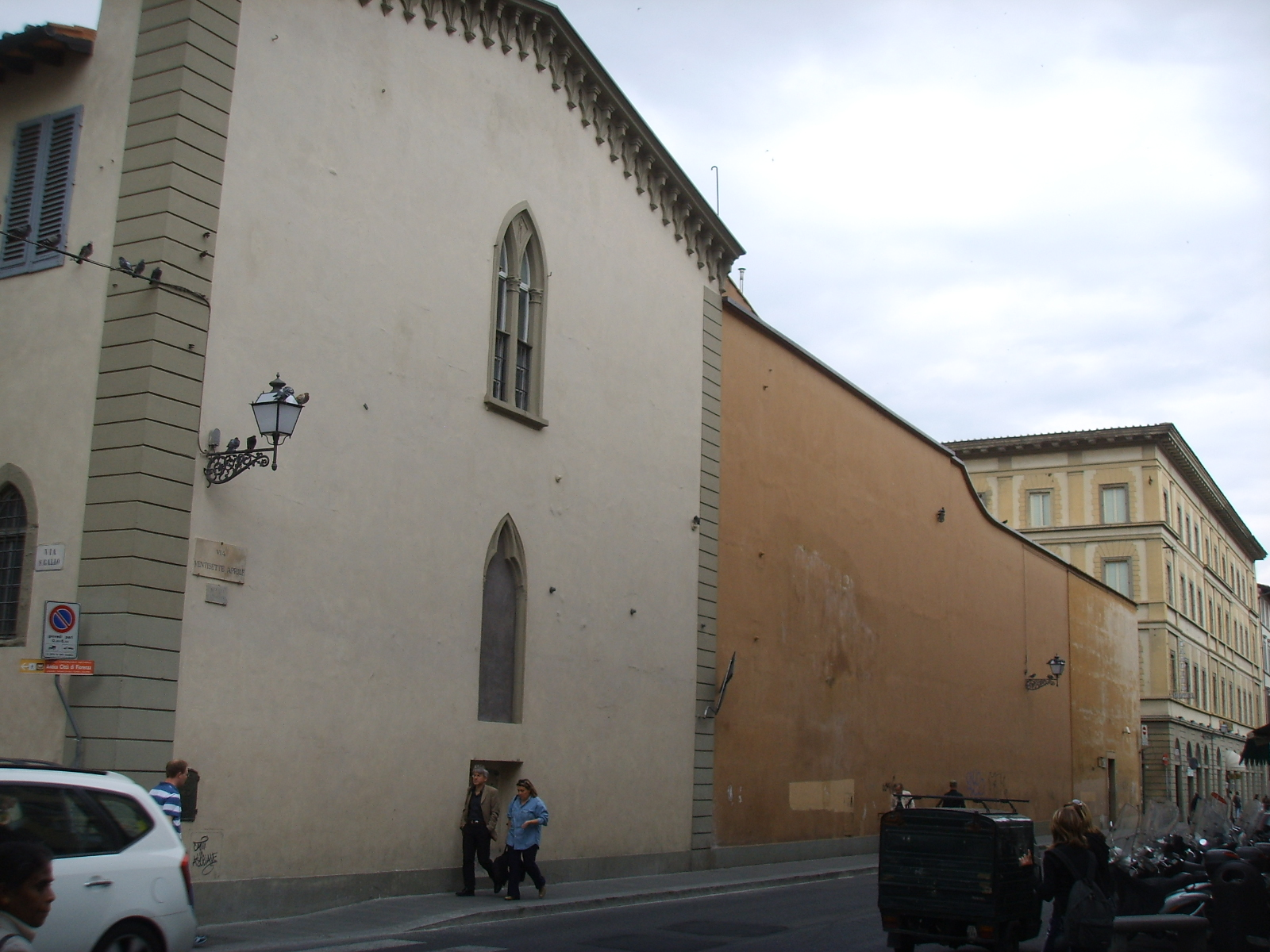
Sant'Apollonia on Via XXVII Aprile with church on left corner, and entrance to the Cenacolo through the door on the windowless façade of the next corner.

Sant'Apollonia was a former Benedictine convent, founded in 1339, north of the center of Florence, in Italy.

Some of the remaining structures are demarcated on three sides by Via Ventisette Aprile, Via Santa Reparata, and Via San Gallo, located about a block west of Piazza San Marco, just north of the city center. The structures of the convent, suppressed since the 19th century, are now put to different uses. The small church building is still present on the corner of Via Ventisette Aprile and San Gallo.

== Museo di Cenacolo di Sant'Apollonia ==
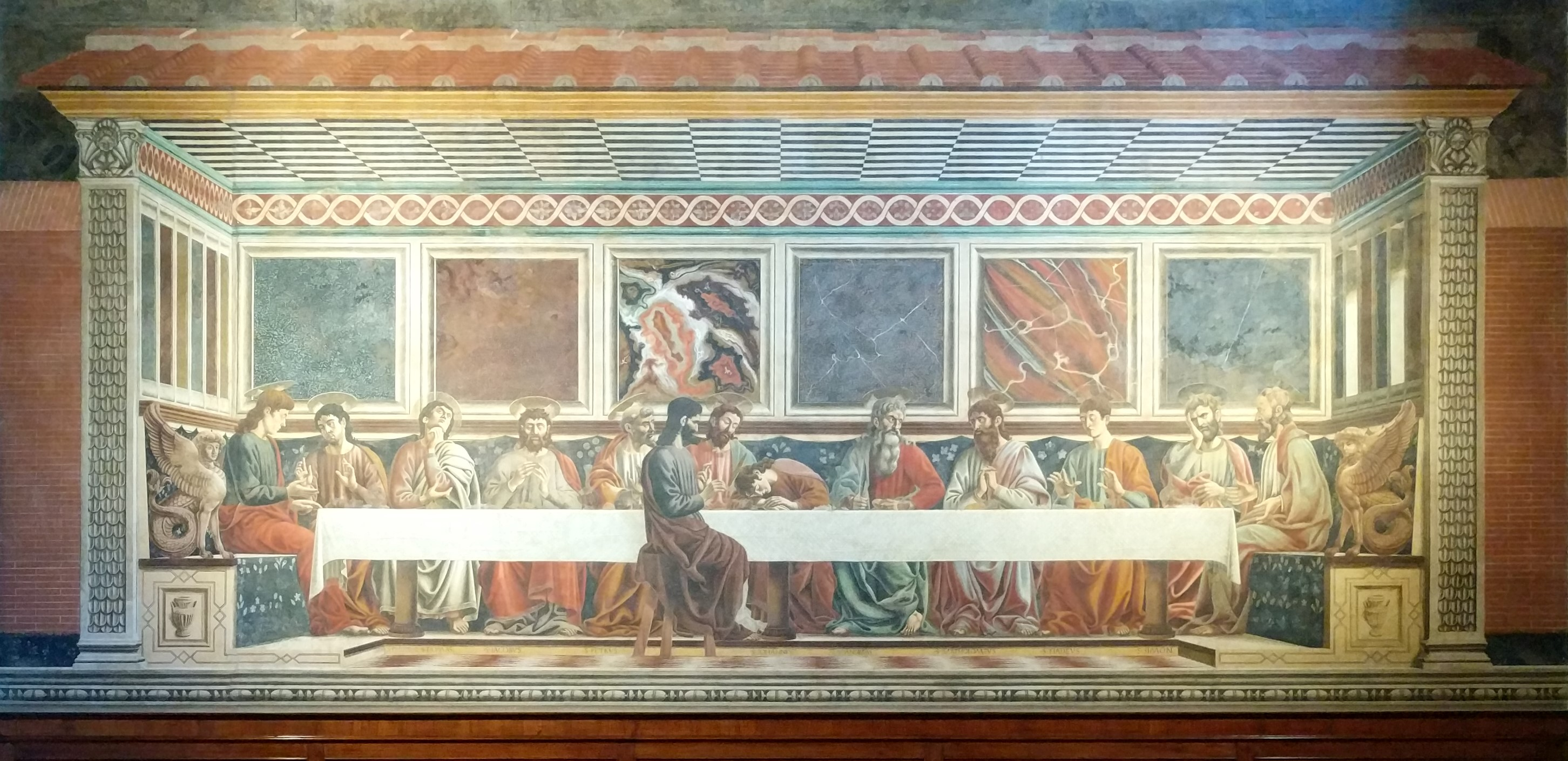
Last supper by Andrea del Castagno.

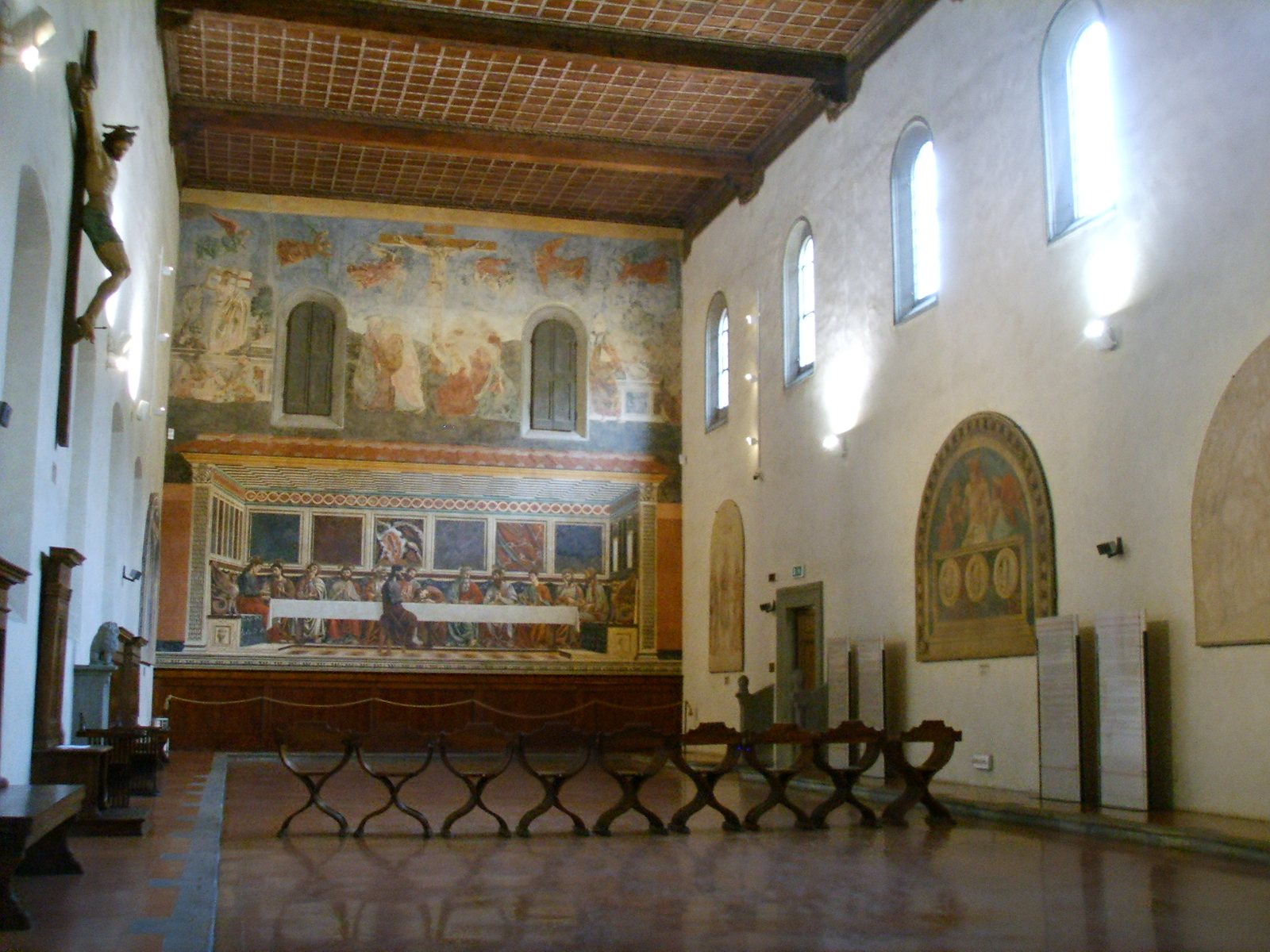
Refectory with Last Supper on lower far wall.

The best known component is the former refectory or dining hall of the convent, the Cenacolo of Sant'Apollonia now part of the Museums of the Commune of Florence, with entrance through an undistinguished door near the corner of Via Ventisette Aprile and Reparata. The refectory harbors the well-conserved fresco, The Last Supper, by the Italian Renaissance artist Andrea del Castagno, along with the same artist's The Dead Christ Supported by Two Angels, originally above a door in the convent. The small museum also displays other fresco designs and works by Castagno, Neri di Bicci, Paolo Schiavo, and Raffaello da Montelupo.
