= Scenes from the Life of Saint Zenobius =

Series of paintings by Sandro Botticelli

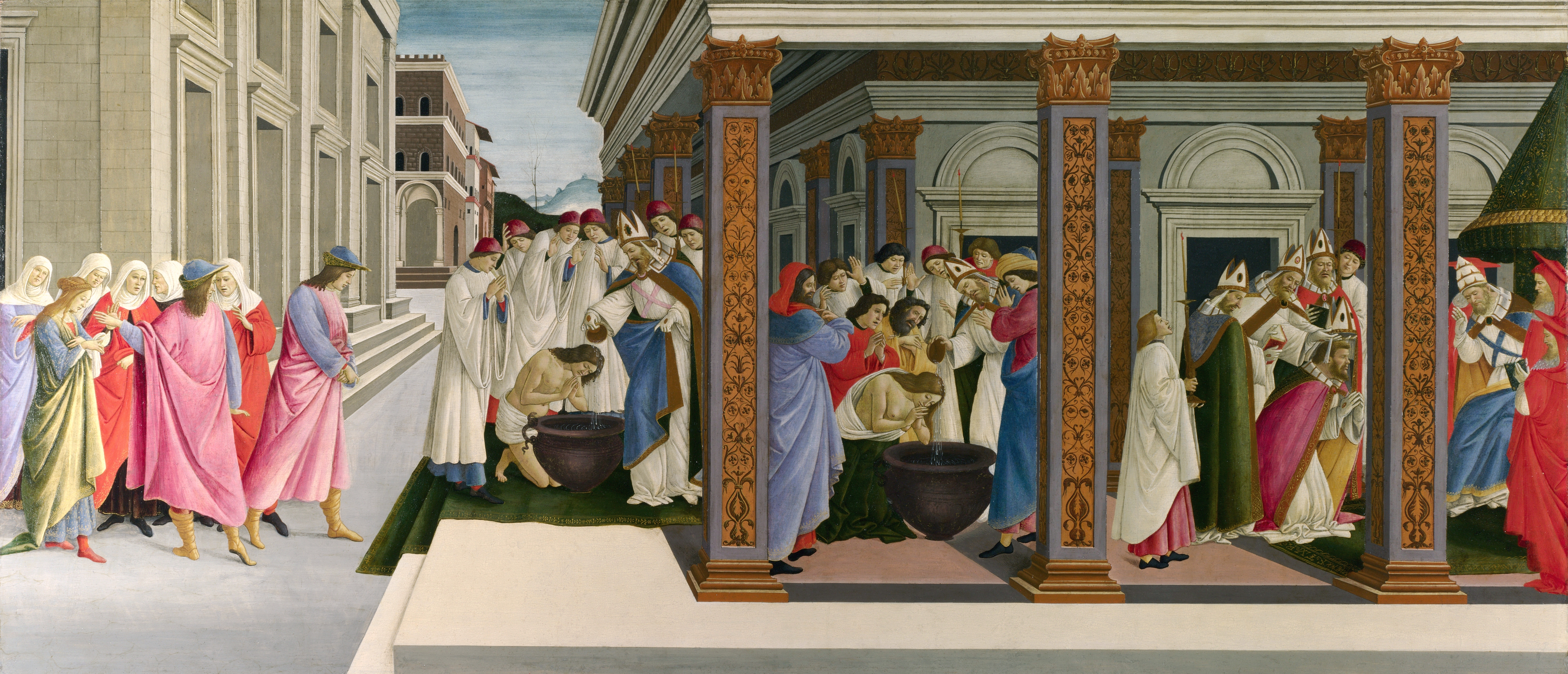
Zenobius rejects the bride chosen by his parents and walks away; Zenobius is baptized; his mother is baptized; he is consecrated as Bishop of Florence by Pope Damasus, London. 66.5 x 149.5 cm

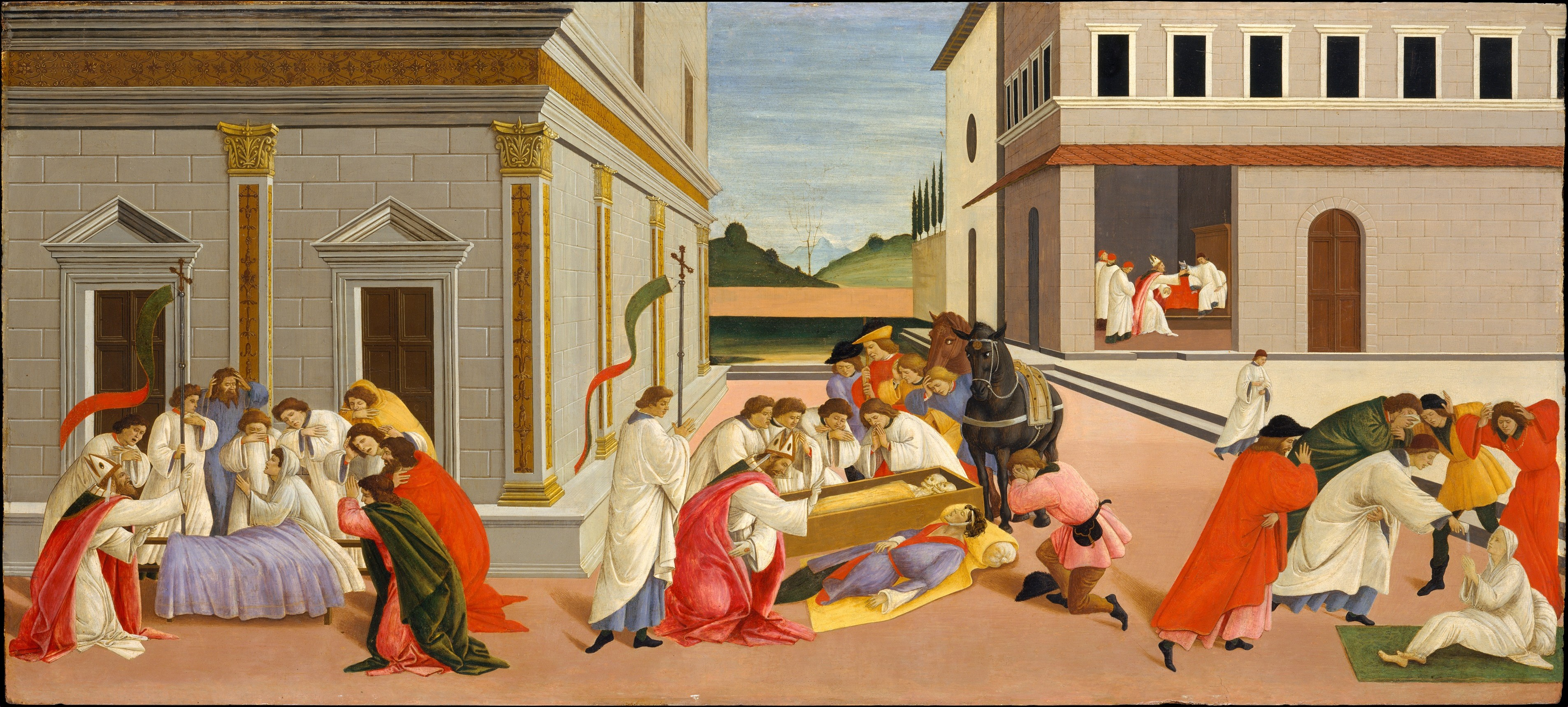
Three miracles, New York, 67.3 x 150.5 cm

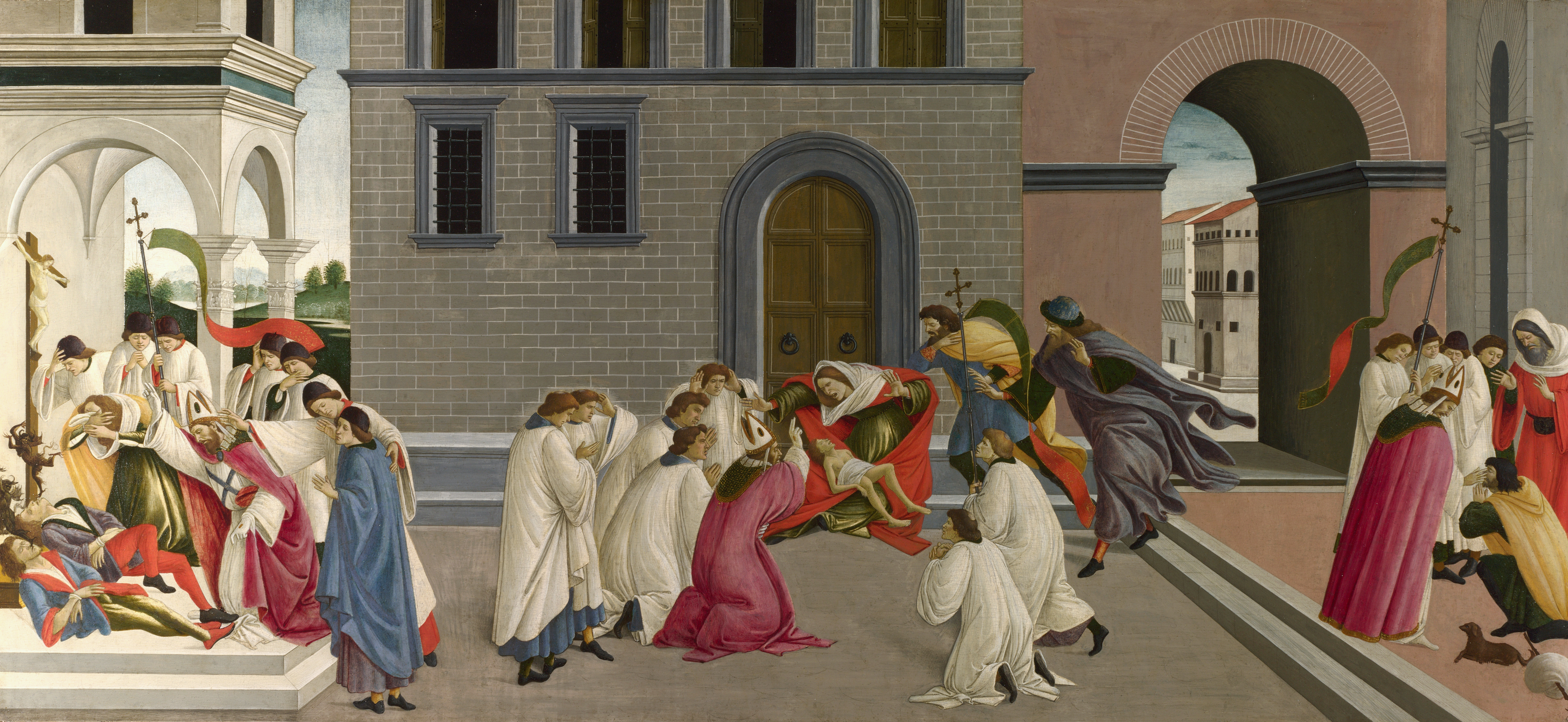
Three miracles, London, 66.5 x 149.5 cm

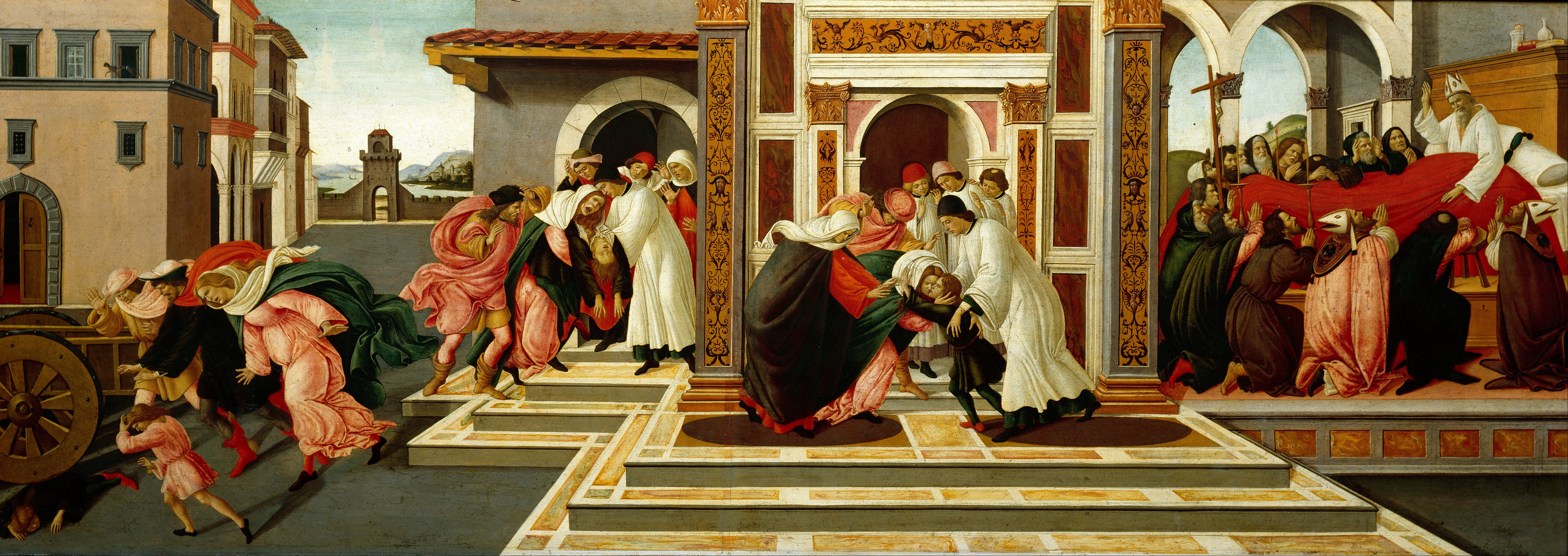
A miracle in three scenes, and the death of Saint Zenobius. Dresden, 66 x 182 cm

Scenes from the Life of Saint Zenobius is a series of paintings by the Italian Renaissance artist Sandro Botticelli. Four panels from the series survive, which are now in three different museums. Each depicts three or more incidents from the life of Zenobius, an early Bishop of Florence who perhaps died in 417. The works are all in tempera on wood, and around 66 cm (26 in) high, though their length varies rather more, from about 149 to 182 cm (59 to 72 in).

The National Gallery in London has two panels. One of these, Four Scenes from the Early Life of Saint Zenobius shows (left to right): Zenobius rejects the bride chosen by his parents, then walks away; Zenobius is baptized; his mother is baptized by the bishop of Florence; he is consecrated as Bishop of Florence by Pope Damasus (this in Rome). The second London panel shows Three Miracles of Saint Zenobius. The Metropolitan Museum of Art in New York has a panel with another three miracles, also called by them Three Miracles of Saint Zenobius. The Gemäldegalerie in Dresden has a panel showing a miracle in three scenes, and the death of the saint.

It is generally agreed that the paintings come from the last phase of Botticelli's career, perhaps c. 1500–1505; some authorities regard them as possibly the artist's latest surviving works.

== Stories of the miracles ==
The New York panel shows: at left Zenobius encounters the funeral procession of a youth, and restores him to life. At centre Zenobius finds a group weeping at the death of a porter who had carried the relics of saints (shown as skeletons in a coffin) over the Apennine range, and restores him to life, with the help of the relics. At right a sub-deacon called Eugenius (who also became a saint) is shown three times: in the bishop's palace interior Zenobius gives him a cup of salt and water, which he carries and then administers to a female relative who had died without receiving the Last Rites, which brings her back to life.

The London miracle panel has three scenes. At left, two young men had treated their mother badly, and been cursed by her. Zenobius exorcises them. At centre: Zenobius restores to life the son of a "noble lady from Gaul". She had left him with the bishop while she made a pilgrimage to Rome, and he died. At right, outside the cathedral he restores the sight of a blind beggar, who had promised to become a Christian in that event.

In the Dresden panel a single miracle is shown in three scenes, from left to right. A young man is run over by a cart and killed. His distraught mother, a widow, carries him to the church. He is resurrected by a prayer of Zenobius (not shown) and reunited with his mother. At right, Zenobius on his death bed.

Some scholars, including Martin Davies, thought that the surviving series may not be complete, since one of the better known miracles of the saint, where a dead elm burst into leaf after being touched by the saint's bier, is not shown in any of these scenes. But this was before the written Life of Zenobius by Fra Clemente Mazza (1475) was identified as the source, rather than another version; the paintings clearly follow the sequence, details and chapter divisions of this, and the sequence appears complete.

== Style and context ==
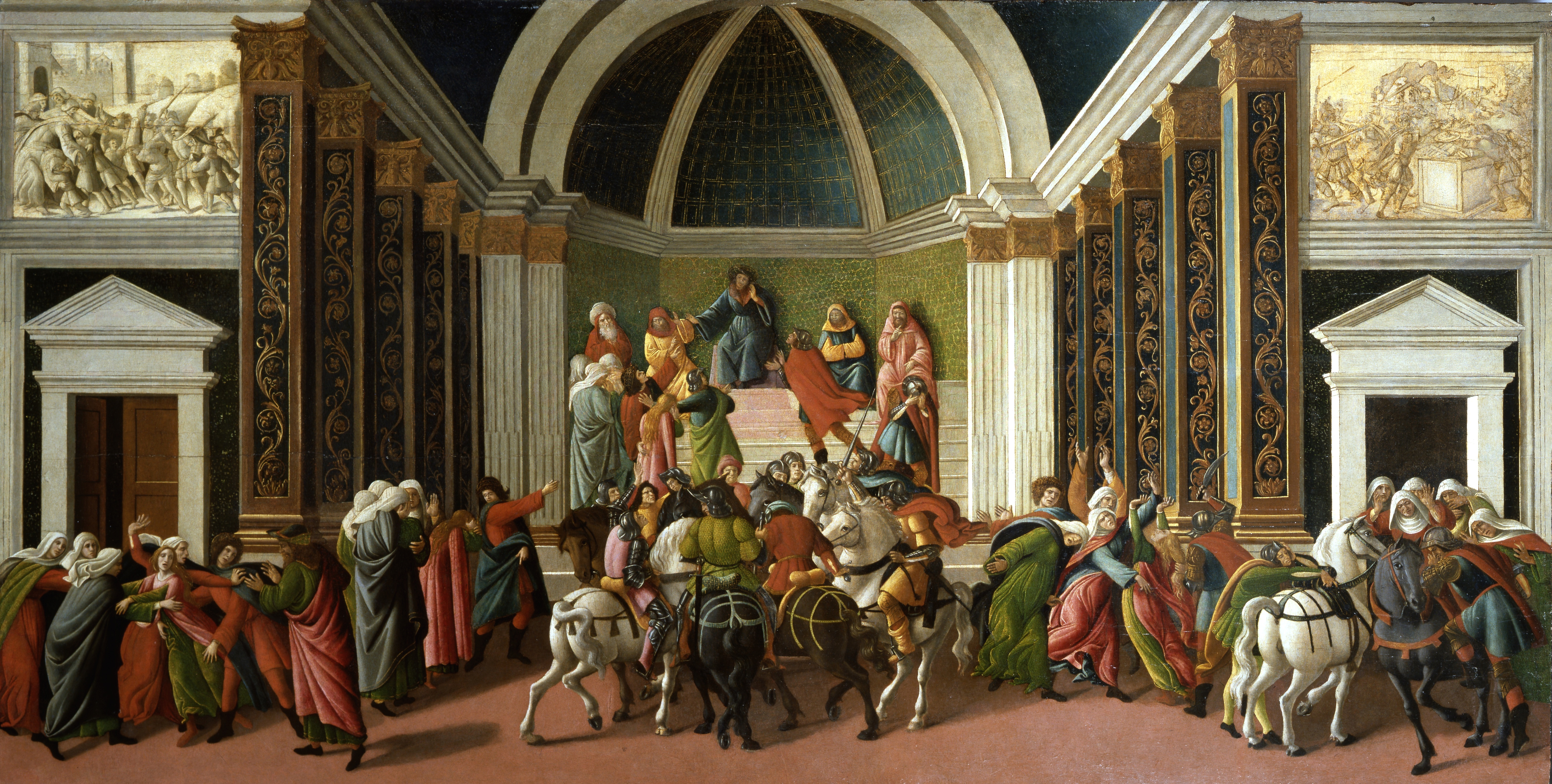
The Story of Virginia, Accademia Carrara (86 x 165cm)

The somewhat stark style of the panels, with contorted figures in anguish and an interest in the architectural backgrounds, is typical of Botticelli's last years. Various degrees of participation in the painting by workshop assistants have been suggested. The drawing of the largely nude figure of Zenobius being baptized has weaknesses, with an arm too puny for the torso and a strange foot.

The series is comparable with another pair of paintings from these last years, also now in different museums. These are The Story of Virginia, now in the Accademia Carrara in Bergamo (86 x 165 cm), and the Story of Lucretia, now Isabella Stewart Gardner Museum, Boston (84 x 177 cm). In these, with a slightly larger scale, both figures, costumes and architecture are more elaborate.

The architecture shows contemporary Florentine styles, which are arguably not in general inappropriate to depict the city in about 360–415. The use of grotesque ornament on the richer buildings is notable. Botticelli has grasped the Roman style so effectively that it is suspected he may have visited Rome since Nero's Golden House was rediscovered around 1480, perhaps for the Holy Year of 1500. In the London panel with the earlier life, the rich building at right represents both an early Florence Cathedral in the baptism and Old Saint Peter's for the consecration by the Pope.

The clergy wear essentially contemporary clerical dress, while most of the laity wear "iconographic" costume, the Renaissance idea of ancient dress, except for men's hats, and the porter, boys and servants, who wear modern dress with shorter jackets. The modern elements in the men's costume, especially the "gold-embroidered peaked hats with contrasting turned-up or turban-shaped crowns" of the upper-class figures, are rather out of date for 1500.

== Pigment analysis ==
The two paintings in the National Gallery in London have been investigated recently. The pigment analysis revealed the usual pigments of the Italian Renaissance with the exception of ultramarine. Botticelli employed red lake and vermilion for the red robes, azurite, lead-tin yellow, lead white, ochres, and artificial malachite (green verditer).

== Provenance ==
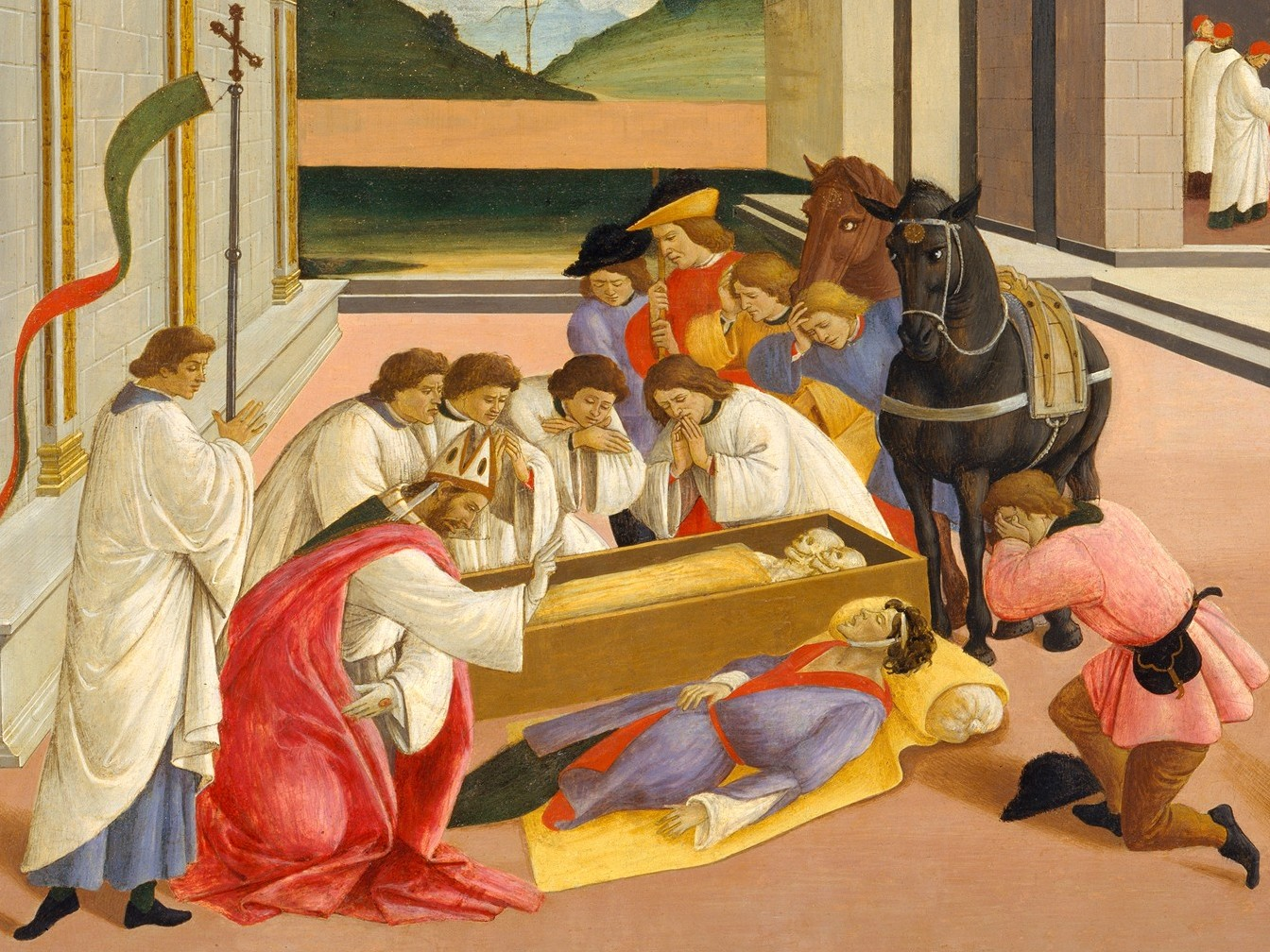
Detail from New York

The panels were possibly commissioned by a religious institution in Florence to be set into wood paneling around a room. It was claimed by C. F. von Rumohr, a German writer, in 1827 that they came from a Compagnia di San Zenobio attached to Florence Cathedral. But it is thought unlikely that they owned any paintings.

Alternatively, they may have been intended for a home. A possible patron was Francesco di Zanobi Girolami (1441–1515), whose brother commissioned the written Life of Zenobius by Fra Clemente Mazza in 1475. This account is closely followed by Botticelli in all the panels. The Girolami family claimed descent from Zenobius' father, had what was said to be his episcopal ring, and had created two chapels dedicated to him. Two of Francesco Girolami's sons married around this time, in 1497 and 1500, and the commission may have been spalliere given by the father for one of these weddings, probably that of Zanobi Girolami in 1500. This was proposed by Ellen Callmann in an article in 1984. The subjects are not typical for art celebrating a wedding, but in the case of the Girolami family their pride in the connection may well explain this.

The Dresden panel reached the art market in the 1820s, and entered the museum in 1868. The other panels came from the Rondinelli collection in Florence around the 1880s. The New York panel was acquired in London by the museum in 1911, having been in an English collection, and the London ones in 1924 in the Mond Bequest.

== Condition ==
The four panels have rather different appearances, which in the past has led some scholars to suggest different authorship. But the differences arise from different treatment, cleaning and restoration, showing the effect different approaches can have. The two London panels are in the best condition, and have been cleaned and restored. The New York panel is in the poorest condition, having been cleaned too aggressively in the past, so that colours appear to have leached. Until 1946 the skeletons in the centre scene were hidden under over-painting. The Dresden panel is merely covered by thick yellowish varnish.

== See also ==
- List of works by Sandro Botticelli
