= Santa Lucia dei Magnoli =

Church in Florence, Italy

Coordinates: 43.765465°N 11.256791°E

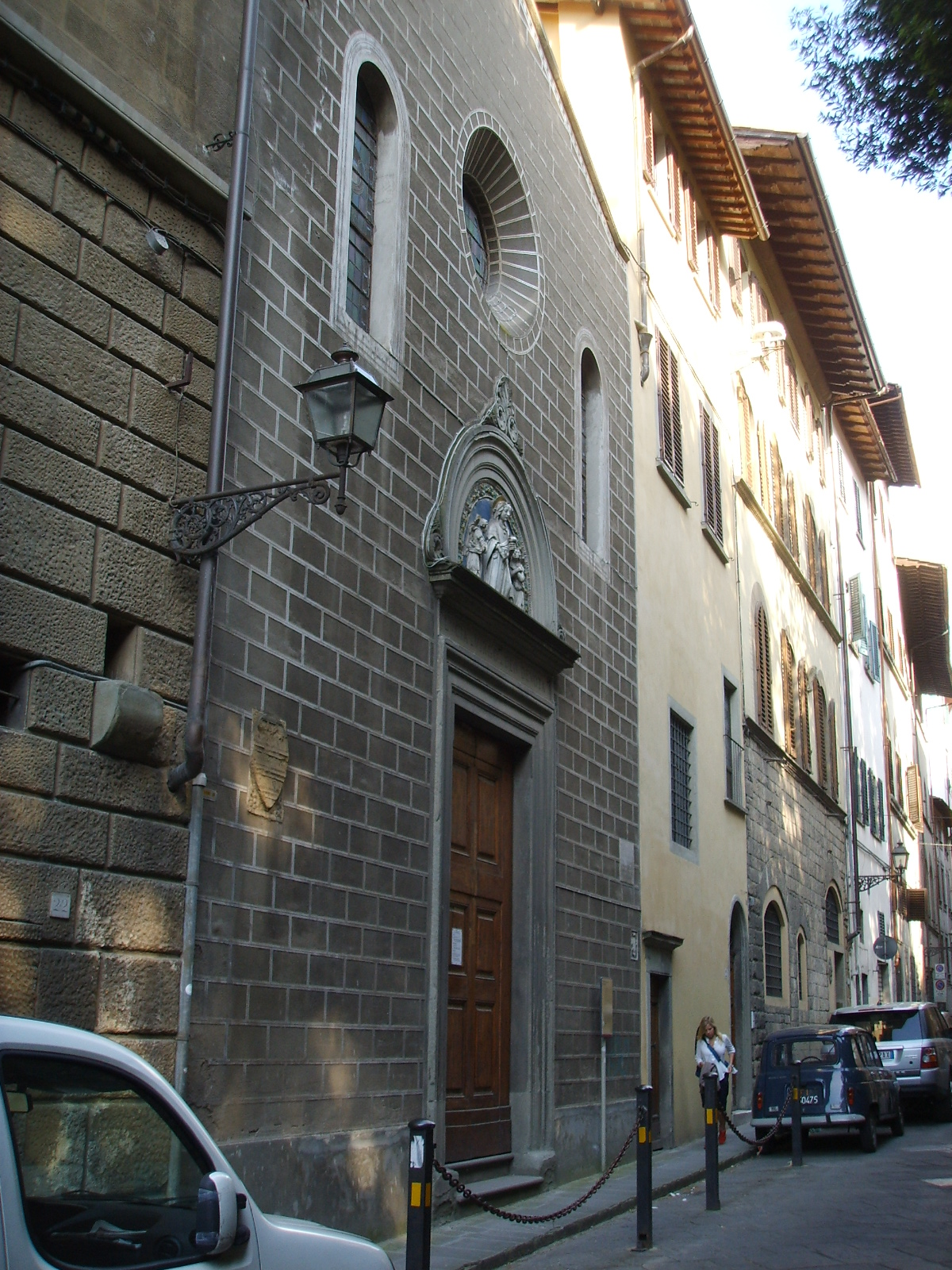
Santa Lucia dè Magnoli

Santa Lucia or Santa Lucia dei Magnoli is a Roman Catholic church located on via de'Bardi in Oltrarno district of Florence, region of Tuscany, Italy.

== History ==
The church had been founded in 1078 by Cavalier Uguccione Della Pressa. At his death, it was patronized by his sons, Magnolo and his descendants, the Magnoli. A lazzaretto or leper colony, was located nearby, visited by St Francis of Assisi in his 1211 visit to Florence. This church was one of the 36 parishes within the last walls of Florence constructed by 1284–1345.

The church has had varied leadership over the centuries, including the Benedictine monastery of San Miniato al Monte until 1246, and the Bishop of Florence after 1373. In 1421, Niccolò da Uzzano patronized the restoration of the church and decoration of the chapel of Lorenzo di Bicci, with scenes from the Life of Santa Lucia. Another major reconstruction took place in 1584 under Cardinal Alessandro dè Medici, later Pope Leo XI.

On the block stone facade, above the portal is a terracotta depiction of Santa Lucia between two angels by Benedetto Buglioni. The church has 14th-century altarpieces depicting a Santa Lucia by Pietro Lorenzetti and two canvases depicting the Annunciation by Jacopo del Sellaio. The main altarpiece is attributed to Agnolo di Donnino; it replaces a Sacra Conversazione, the Santa Lucia de' Magnoli Altarpiece by Domenico Veneziano, now in the Uffizi Gallery.
