= Santa Lucia de' Magnoli Altarpiece =

c. 1445 painting by Domenico Veneziano

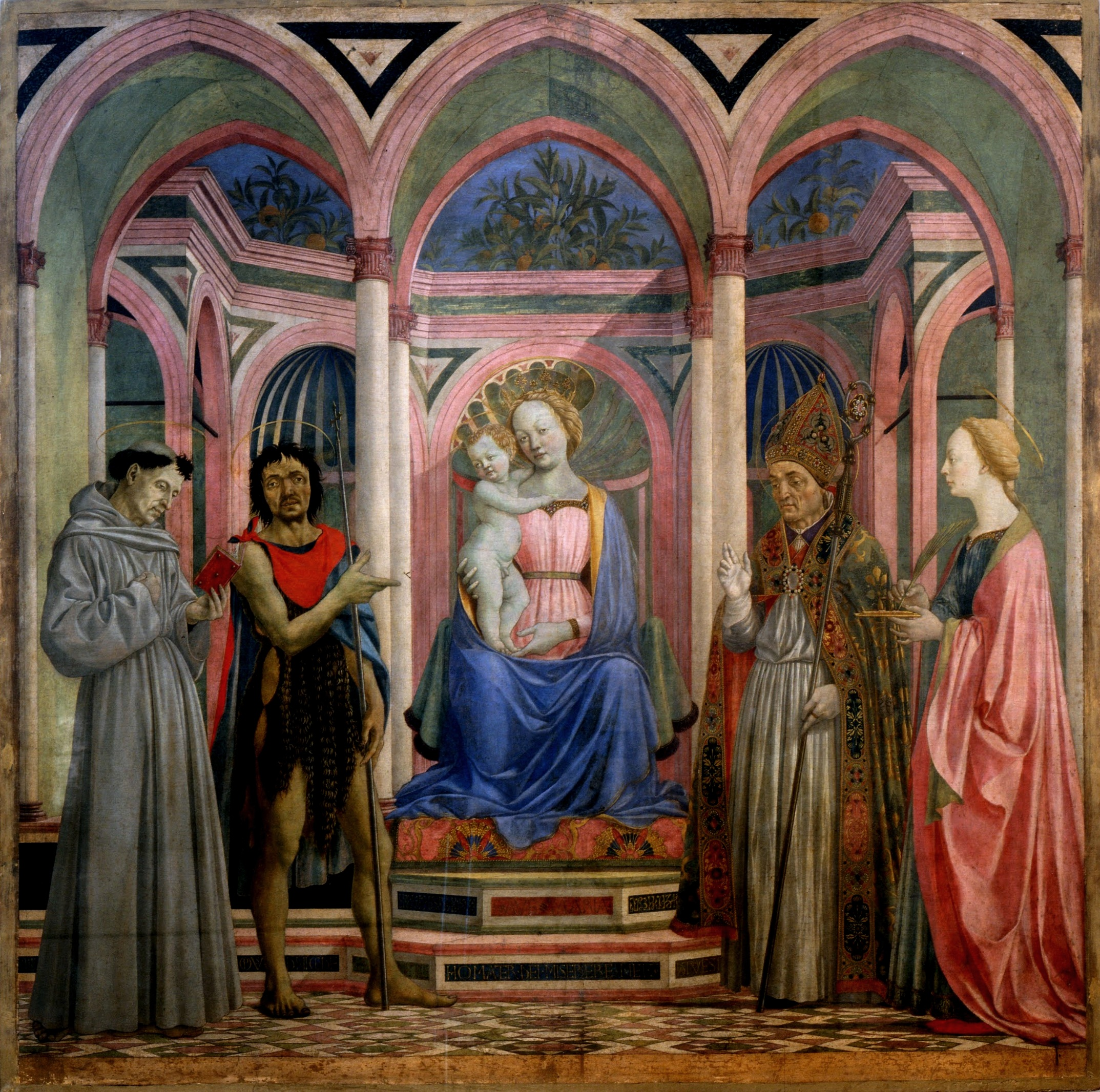
- Artist: Domenico Veneziano
- Year: c. 1445–1447
- Medium: Tempera on panel
- Dimensions: 210 cm × 215 cm (83 in × 85 in)
- Location: Uffizi, Florence, Italy

The Santa Lucia de' Magnoli Altarpiece (Italian: Pala di Santa Lucia de' Magnoli) is a painting by the Italian painter Domenico Veneziano, dated to around 1445–1447. Once placed at the high altar of the church of Santa Lucia dei Magnoli, Florence, it is now in the Uffizi Gallery in the same city. The large panel had originally a predella, which has been divided between museums in Washington, Berlin and Cambridge.

It has been described as "almost certainly ... the first true sacra conversazione", or painting of the Virgin and Child with saints on a unified scale and sharing the same space.

== Description ==
The painting is one of the earliest known examples of tabula quadrata et sine civoriis as suggested by Brunelleschi, which meant a "modern" type of painting without the inner frames and the gilded background which was typical of earlier painting. The setting is however reminiscent of the frames, with three ogival arches, the columns and the shell-shaped niches. The polychrome floor, and the architecture, including the base of the Madonna's throne, is depicted with the use of geometrical perspective, an innovation introduced in Italian early Renaissance art.

The saints portrayed are St John the Baptist and St Zenobius (patron saints of Florence), St Lucy (titular of the church where the painting was situated) and St Francis, who resided in the church at his arrival in Florence in 1211. The garments and the mitre of St Zenobius are particularly rich, with precious stones, pearls, golden plaques and enamels.

== Predella ==
Reconstruction of the original predella

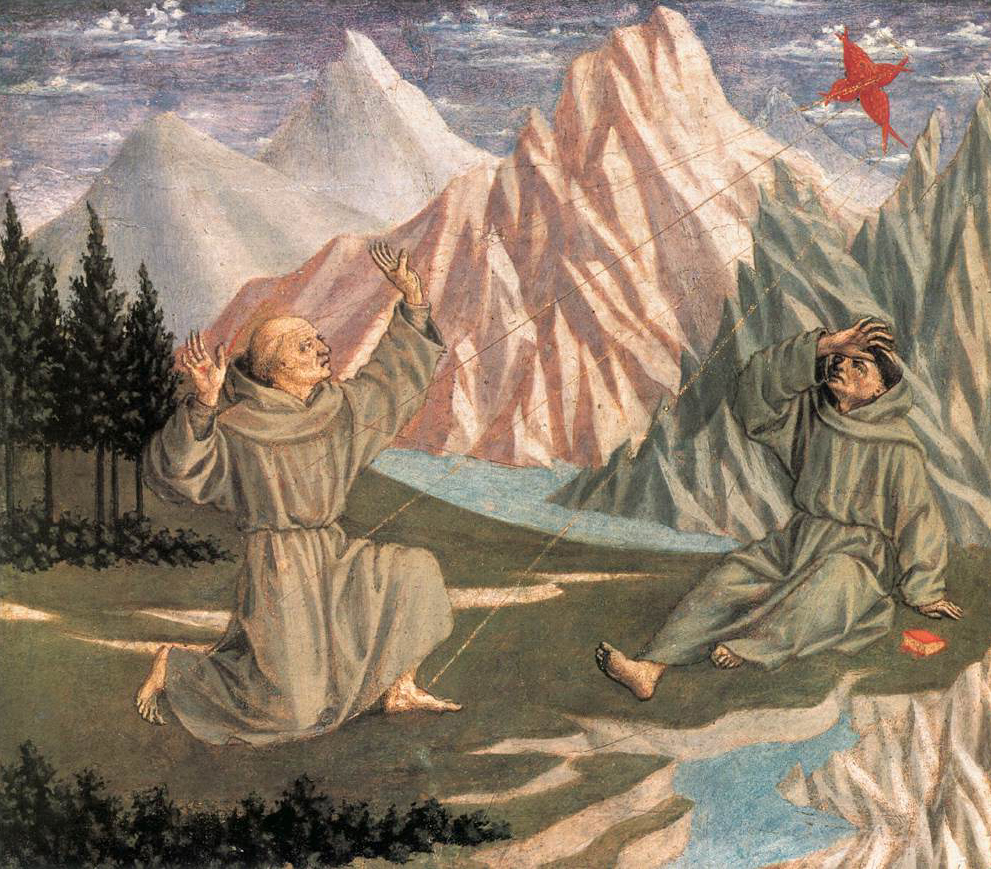
The Stygmata of St. Francis

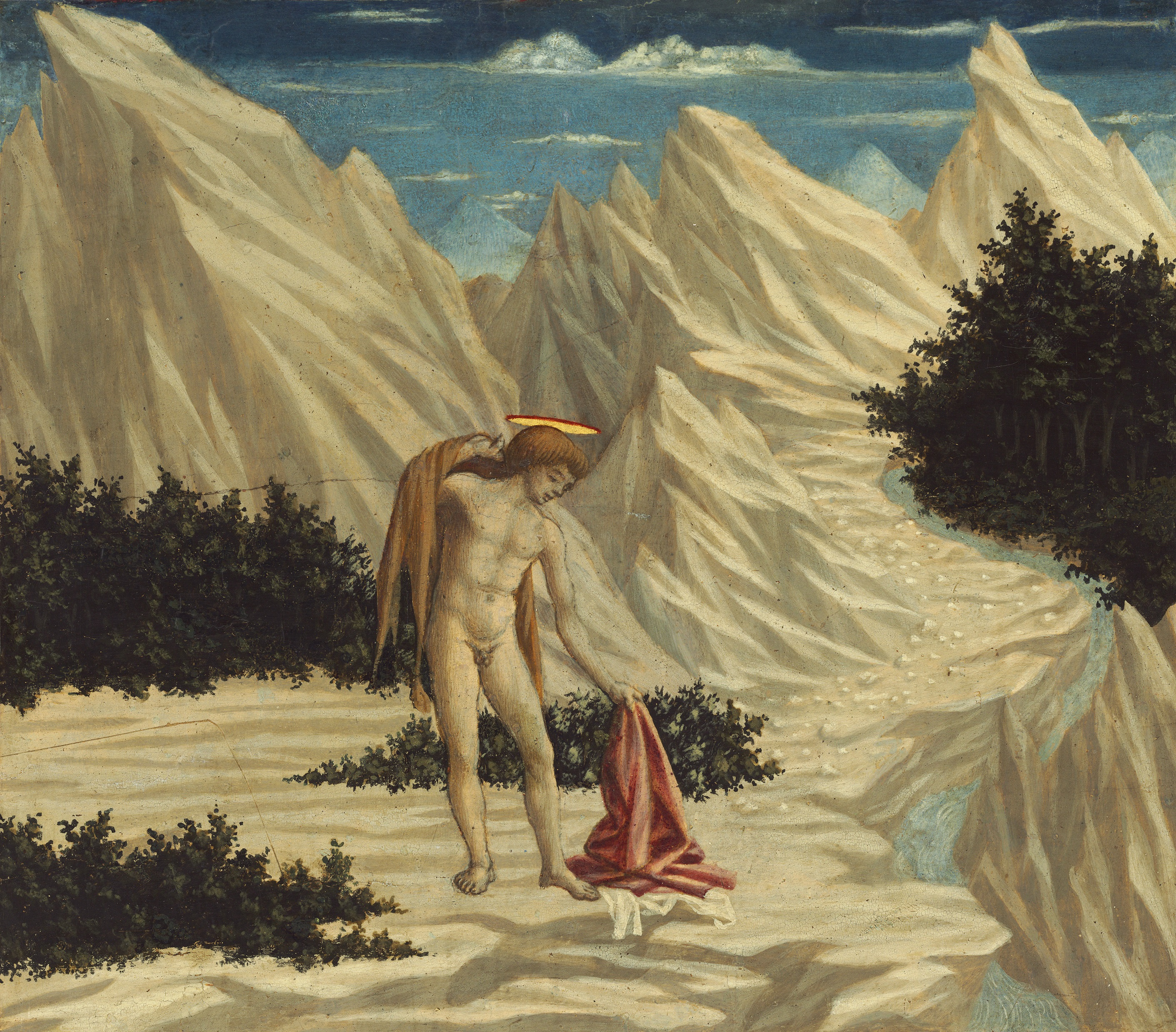
John the Baptist in the Desert

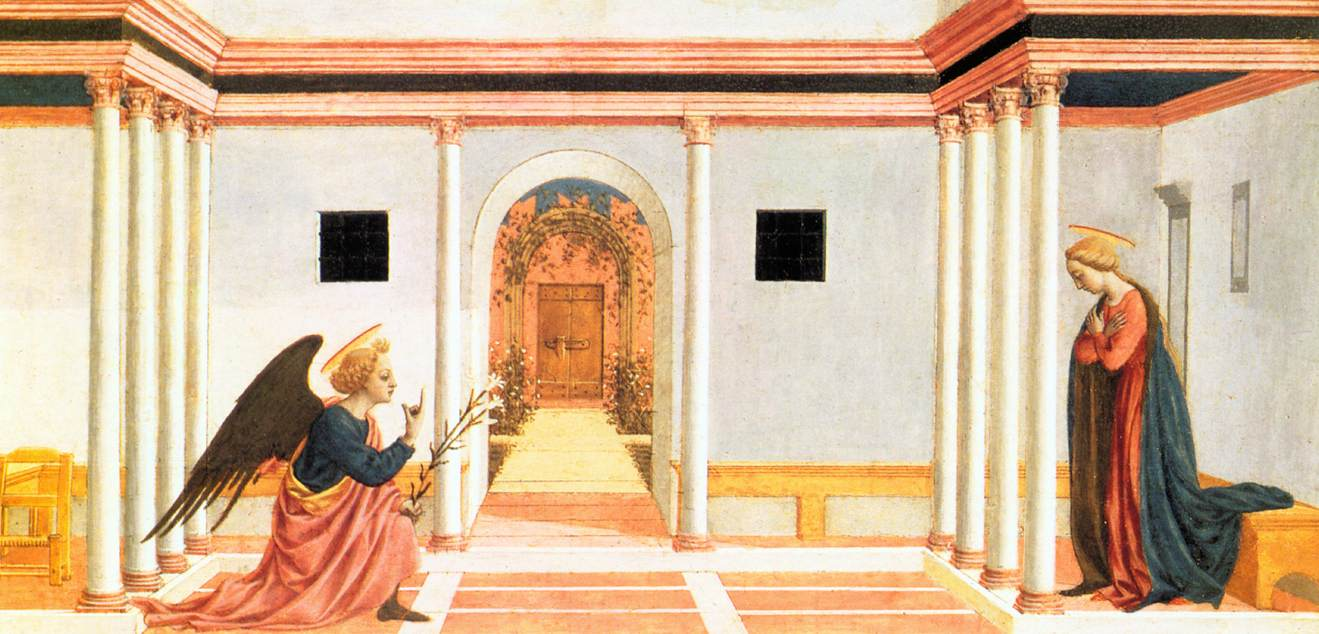
Annunciation

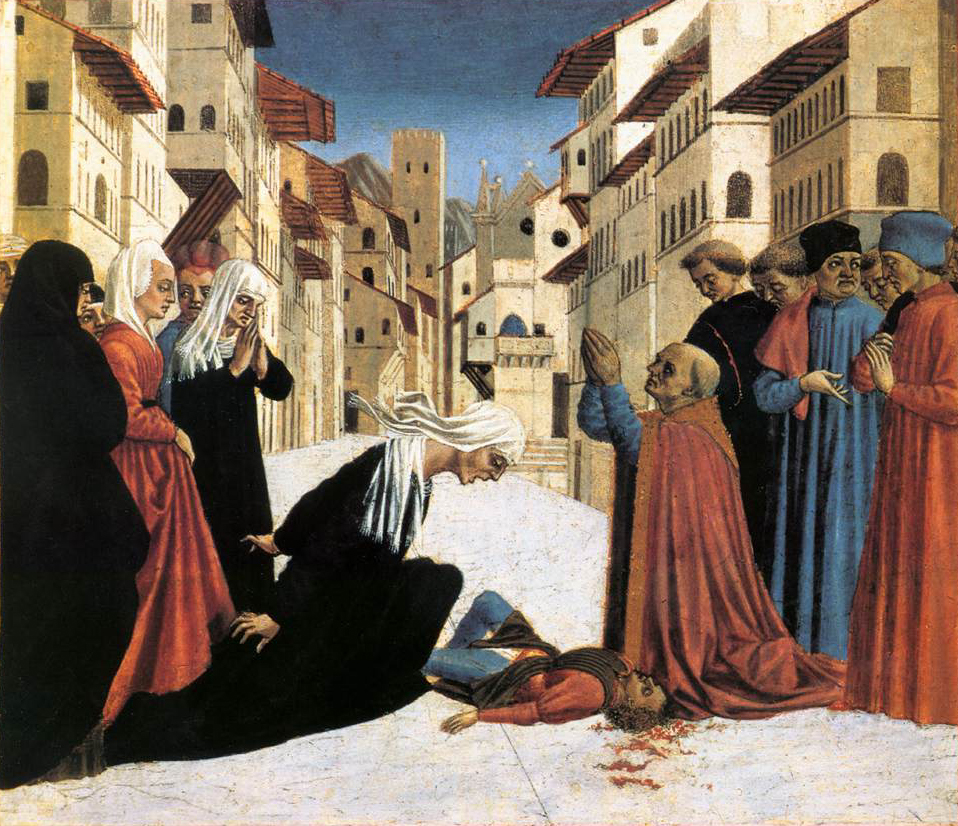
The Miracles of St. Zenobius

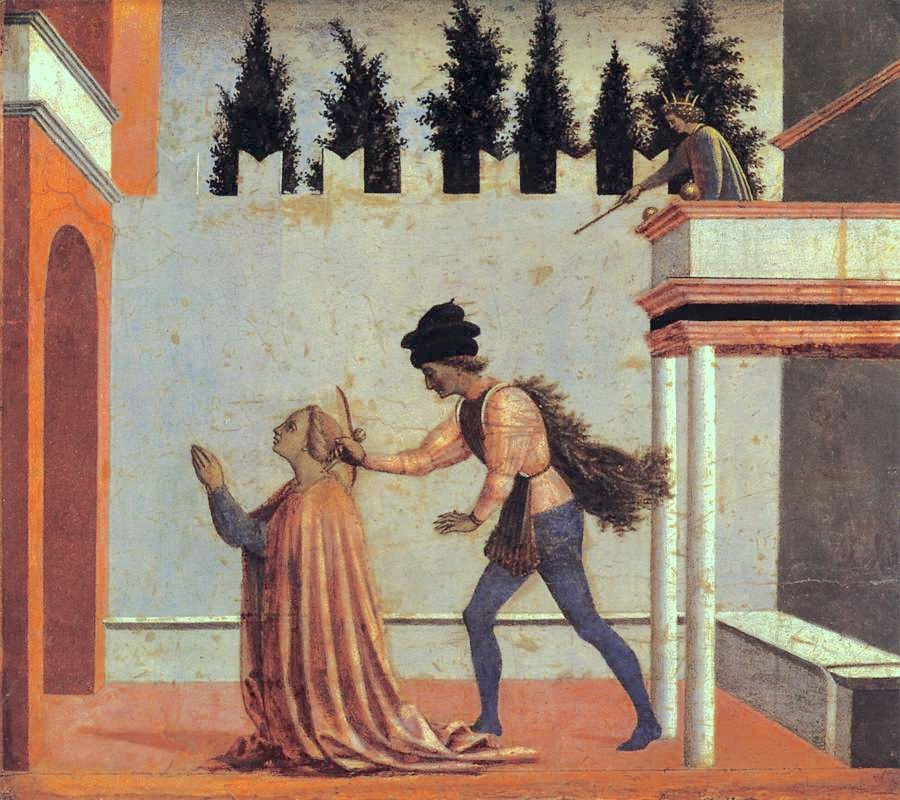
The Martyrdom of St. Lucy

The predella included panels with scenes of the saints of the main composition, and a central, double-size Annunciation: the Stygmata of St. Francis and John Baptist in the Desert are currently in the National Gallery of Art in Washington, the Annunciation and The Miracle of St. Zenobius are in the Fitzwilliam Museum of Cambridge, and the Martyrdom of St. Lucy is in the Berlin State Museums.

External videos
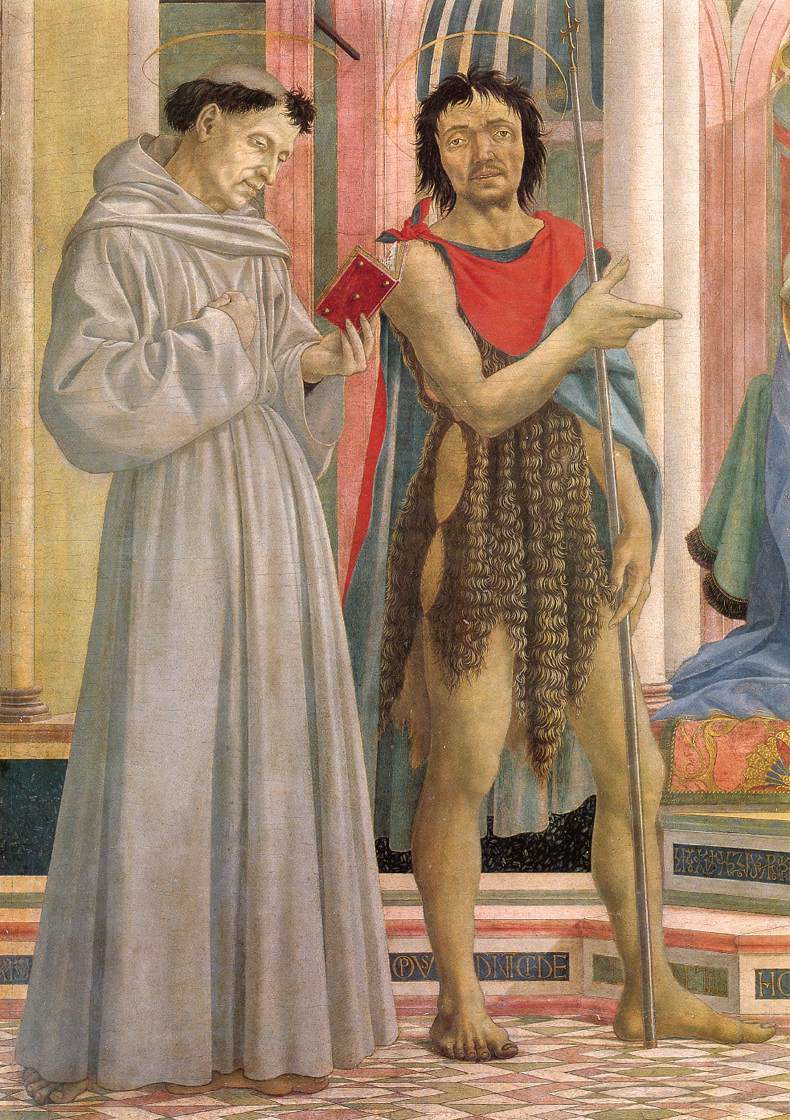
- Veneziano's St. Lucy Altarpiece, Smarthistory

== Sources ==
- Galleria degli Uffizi. I Grandi Musei del Mondo. Rome. 2003.
