= Berenson Madonna =

Painting by Domenico Veneziano

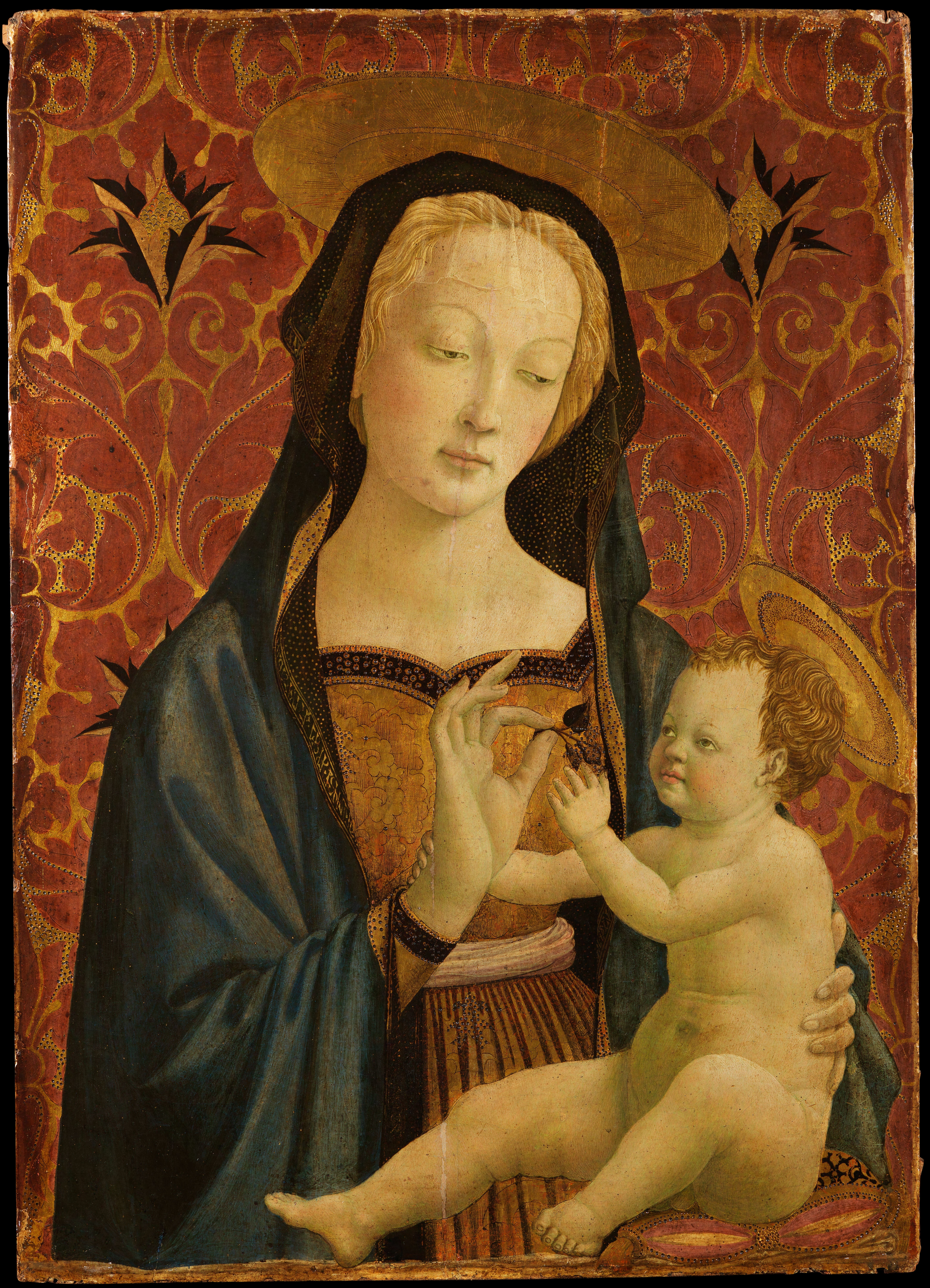

The Berenson Madonna is a c.1432–1437 tempera and gold on panel painting by Domenico Veneziano, now in the Berenson collection at Villa I Tatti in Settignano. It was auctioned by the Panciatichi family and acquired by Berenson for his personal collection.

The painting depicts Mary offering her son a bud or a small pear tree, an allusion to the original sin that Christ will wash away with his sacrifice, while the pomegranate motif in the background symbolizes the Resurrection. In their critique of the painting, museum Le Mostre Impossibili opined that "the delicate face of the Madonna acquires soft rosy light from the gold that bursts from her clothing, where we see the brocade motif of the pomegranate, so beloved by the upper classes of the period and returning, in stylised form, in the velvet vestment that forms the background, in sumptuously elegant bursts".
