= Spalliera =

Painting mounted into furniture or panelling

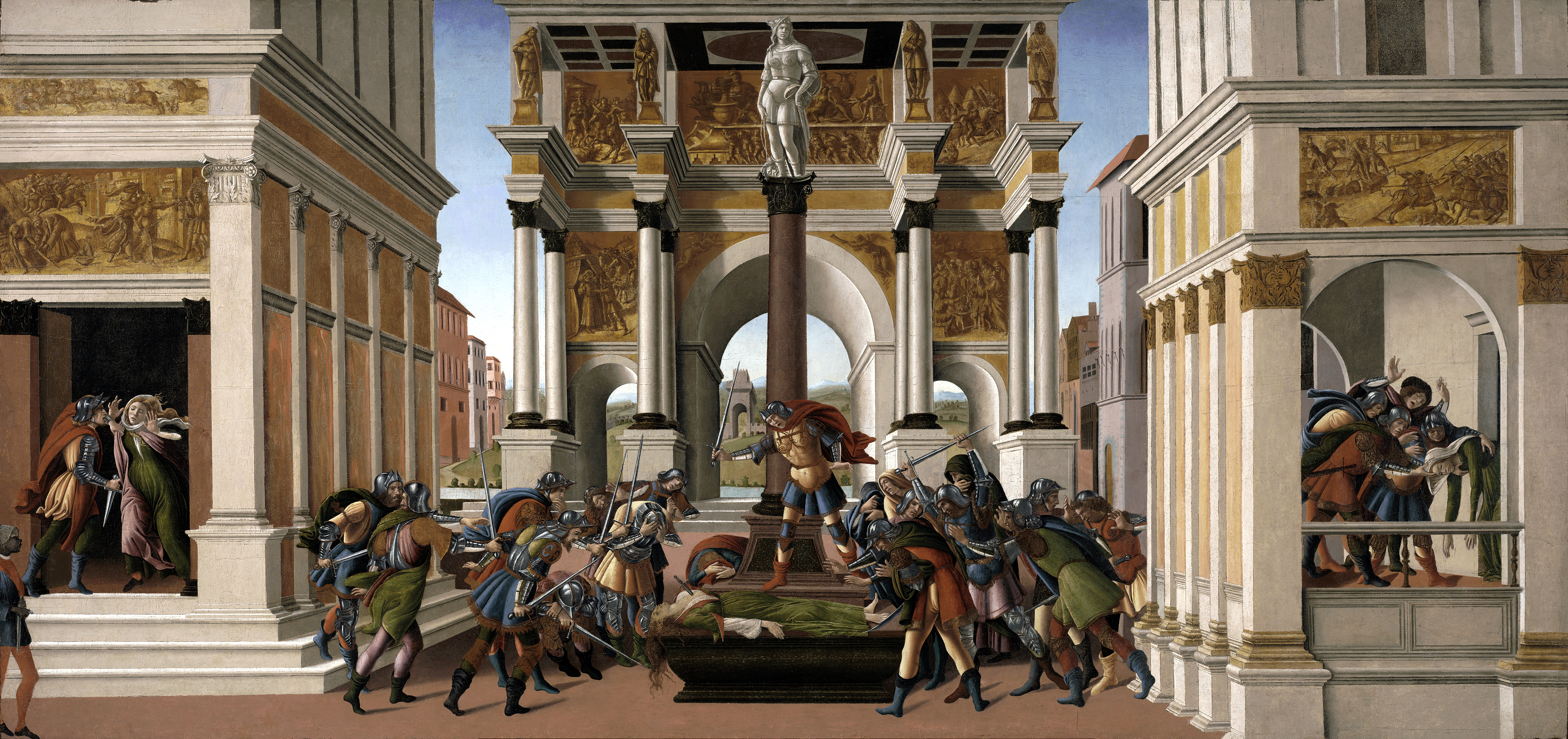
The Tragedy, Death or Suicide of Lucretia, a painting for a spalliera by Sandro Botticelli

A spalliera (Plural: spalliere) is a decorated backboard mounted on a wall, often behind a cassone (a wooden chest used for storage), or as a headboard to a bed. It is usually made out of wood and embellished with decorative aspects such as intricate carving or painting, and is gilded as well. They were common in Renaissance Tuscany.

No examples of Florentine sets of spalliere with inset paintings have survived intact. At the most expensive level, all four walls of a room seem to have had panels fitted, which were richly decorated with carved wood, marquetry, and sometimes paintings inset into the wood. These paintings were usually much wider than tall, like the painted panels on cassoni. They seem often to have been made to celebrate a wedding, and fitted to the marital bedroom, though other important rooms also had them.

Sandro Botticelli and Piero di Cosimo are two of the better known painters who produced many paintings whose wide format suggests that this was their original function; they have now been given conventional picture frames.
