= Zenobius of Florence =

First bishop of Florence (337–417)

Saint Zenobius
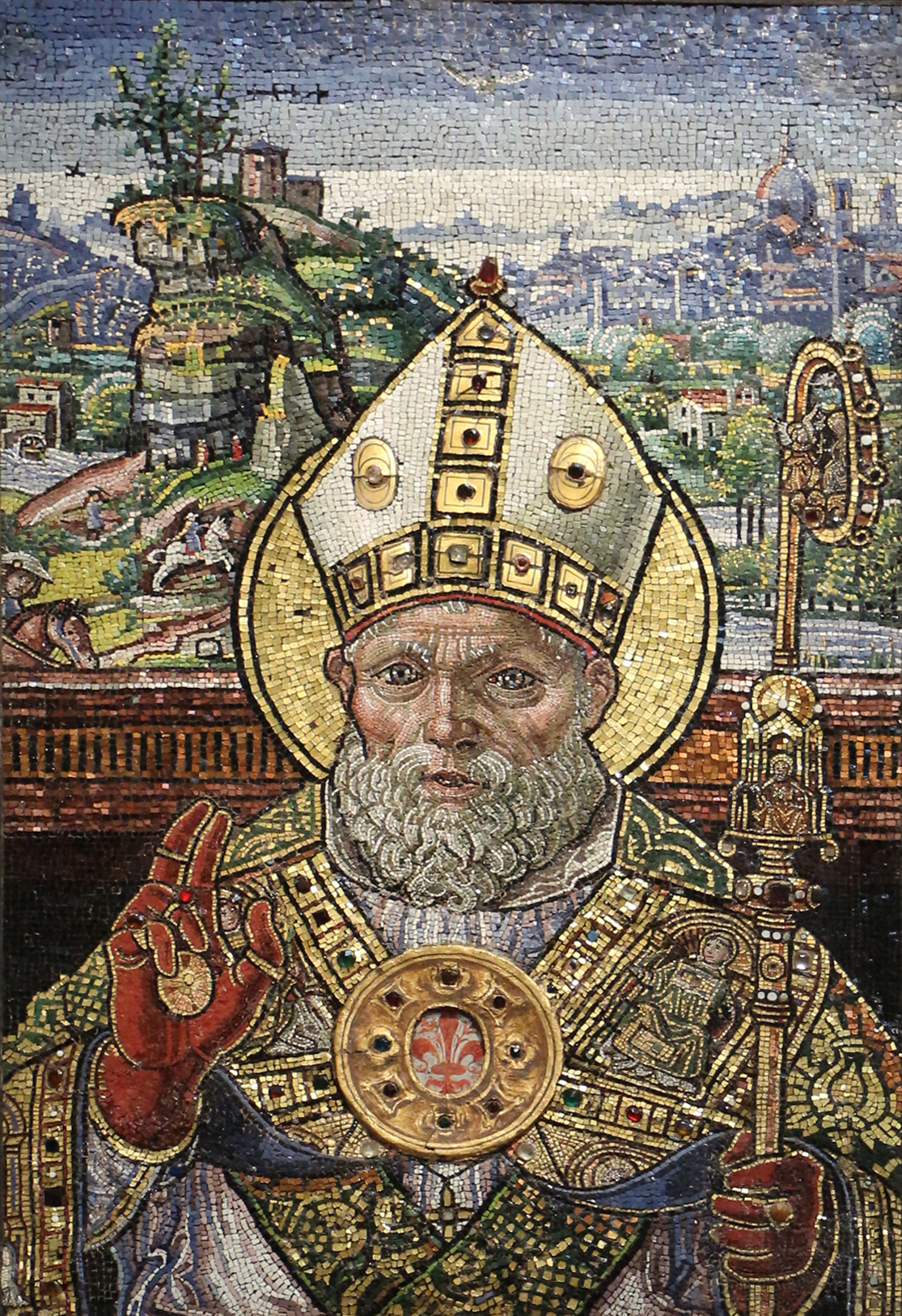
- Saint Zenobius by Monte di Giovanni
- Born: 337 AD; Florence
- Died: 417 AD; Florence
- Venerated in: Catholic Church
- Major shrine: Santa Maria del Fiore, Florence
- Feast: May 25
- Attributes: Usually shown in episcopal garb; often shown bringing a dead man or child back to life; flowering tree
- Patronage: Florence

Saint Zenobius (Italian: San Zanobi, Zenobio) (337–417) who was the first bishop of Florence. Venerated in the Catholic Church, his feast day is celebrated on May 25.

== Life ==
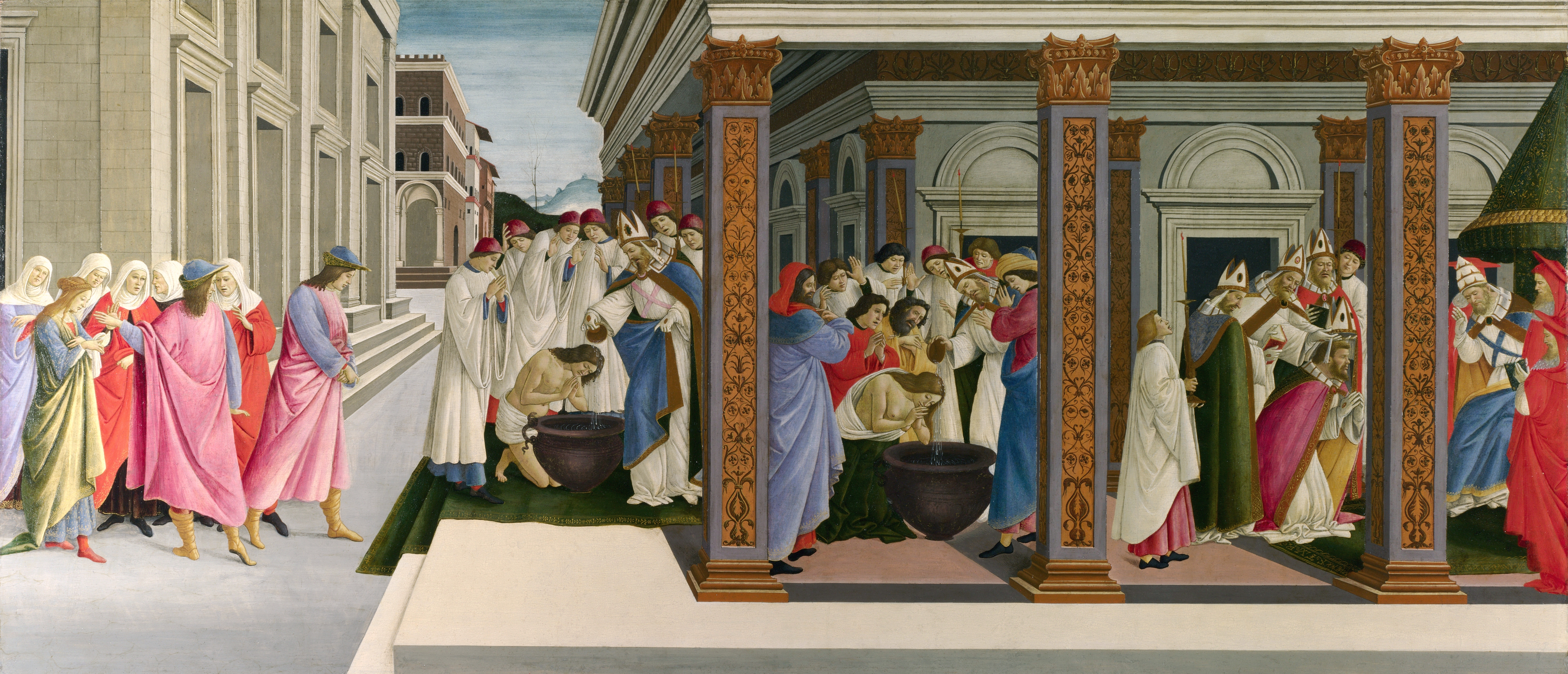
The Baptism of Saint Zenobius and His Appointment as a Bishop, Sandro Botticelli

Born of a Florentine noble family, Zenobius was educated by his pagan parents. He came under the influence early of the bishop Theodore, was baptized by him, and succeeded, after much opposition, in bringing his father and mother to Christianity. He embraced the clerical state, and rapidly rose to the position of archdeacon, when his virtues and notable powers as a preacher made him known to Saint Ambrose, at whose instance Pope Damasus I (r. 366–386) called him to Rome, and employed him in various important missions, including a legation to Constantinople. On the death of Damasus he returned to his native city, where he resumed his apostolic labours, and on the death of the bishop of that see, Zenobius, to the great joy of the people, was appointed to succeed him. His deacons are venerated as Saint Eugene and Saint Crescentius. He evangelized Florence and its outskirts completely and combated Arianism.

According to his biographer and successor in the See of Florence, Antonius, he died in his ninetieth year, in 424; but, as Antonius says that Pope Innocent I (d. 417) was at the time pope, the date is uncertain.

There are grounds for believing that he actually died in 417, on 25 May, on which day the ancient tower where he is supposed to have lived, near the Ponte Vecchio, was annually decorated with flowers.

== Veneration ==
His body was first buried in the Basilica di San Lorenzo di Firenze (consecrated by Saint Ambrose in 393), and in the 9th century was later translated by Bishop Andrea to the church of Santa Reparata, over which the current Florence Cathedral was built.

In the back of the middle of the three apses of the cathedral is the altar of Saint Zenobius. Its bronze shrine, designed around 1440, a masterpiece of Ghiberti, contains the urn with his relics. The central relief shows us one of his miracles, the reviving of a dead child. Above this shrine is the painting Last Supper by Giovanni Balducci. There was also a glass-paste mosaic panel The Bust of Saint Zenobius by the 16th century miniaturist Monte di Giovanni, but it is now on display in the Museo dell'Opera del Duomo.

The Colonna di San Zanobi, located at Piazza San Giovanni near the Baptistery of San Giovanni, is another site of veneration for Saint Zenobius. According to tradition, during the 9th-century translation of Saint Zenobius's remains from the Basilica of San Lorenzo to the then-Cathedral of Santa Reparata, the bier carrying his body touched a dead elm tree near the Baptistery, causing it to miraculously burst into bloom despite it being winter. To commemorate this event, a column known as the "Colonna di San Zanobi" was erected at the site. The original column was swept away during the flood of 1333 and later rebuilt. The current column features a metal representation of a tree and serves as a testament to this miracle.

The Episcopal Ring of Saint Zenobius, considered a secondary relic, was in the possession of the Girolami family, who claimed descent from the saint. In 1482, the ring was sent to France in an effort to cure the ailing King Louis XI. However, there is no record of the ring's effectiveness, and King Louis XI died in 1483. The current whereabouts of the ring remain unknown.

== Miracles ==
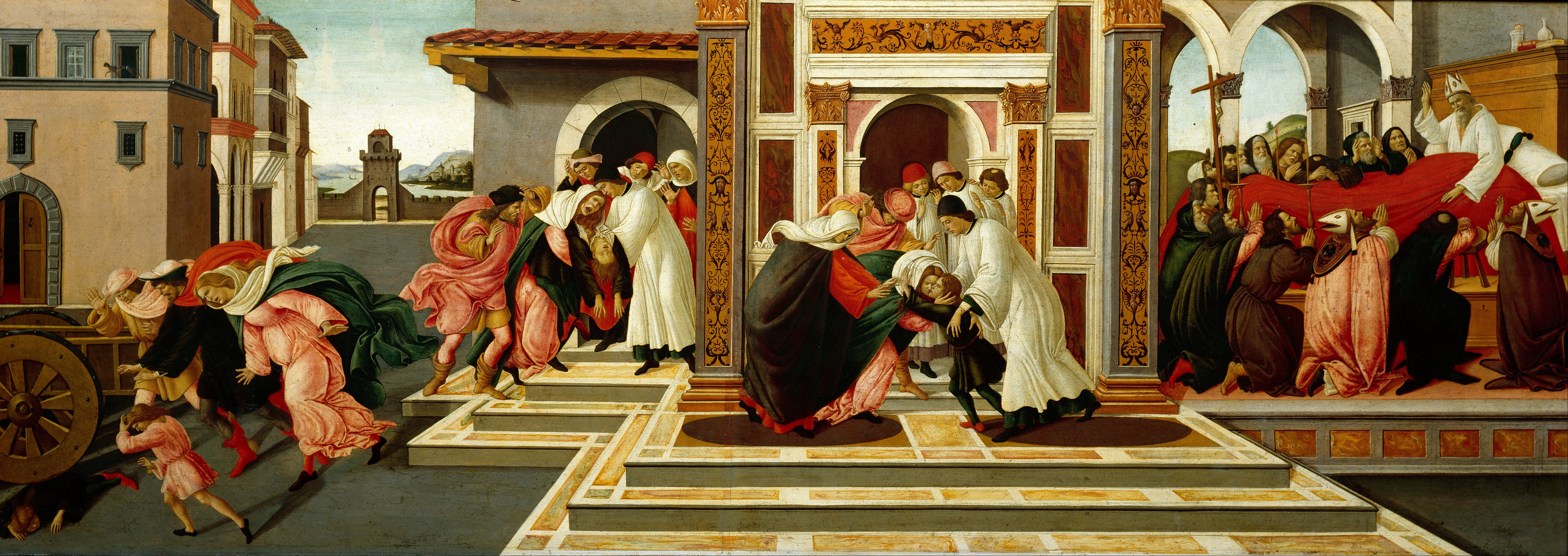
The Last Miracle and Death of Saint Zenobius, by Botticelli

Extraordinary miracles, including several instances of the restoration of the dead to life, are attributed to him. Zenobius is said to have resurrected several dead people. It is also said that after his death, a dead elm burst into life after his body touched it while being borne to the cathedral for burial.

A legend states that a child was once run over by a cart while playing. His mother, a widow, wailed as she brought the dead child to Zenobius' deacon. By means of a prayer, Saint Zenobius revived the child and restored him to his mother.

== In art ==
Zenobius is often depicted with a dead child or man in his arms, or a flowering elm, both in reference to his miracles.

Sandro Botticelli depicted the life and work of Saint Zenobius in four paintings. In the first scene, Zenobius is shown twice: he rejects the bride that his parents intended him to take in marriage and walks thoughtfully away. The other episodes show the baptism of the young Zenobius and his mother, and on the right his ordination as bishop.

On the wall of the Palazzo Vecchio are frescoes by Domenico Ghirlandaio, painted in 1482. The apotheosis of Saint Zenobius was painted with a perspectival illusion of the background.

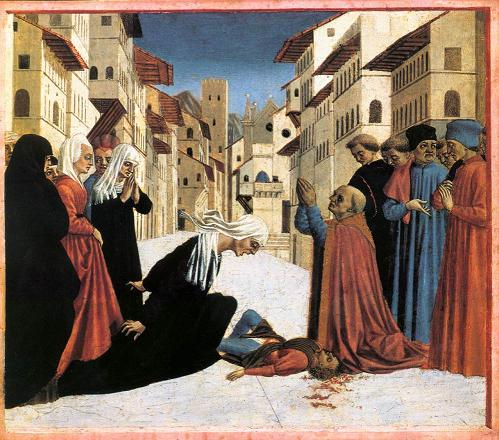
Domenico Veneziano, Saint Zenobius Performs a Miracle, 1445.

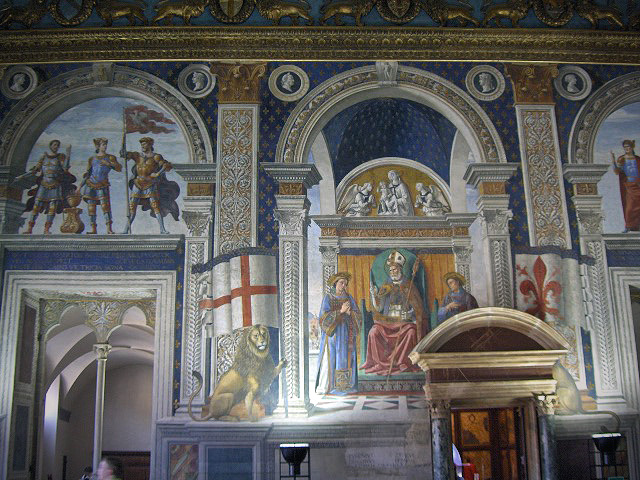
Wall fresco of Saint Zenobius in the Hall of Lilies (Sala dei Gigli), Palazzo Vecchio, Florence.

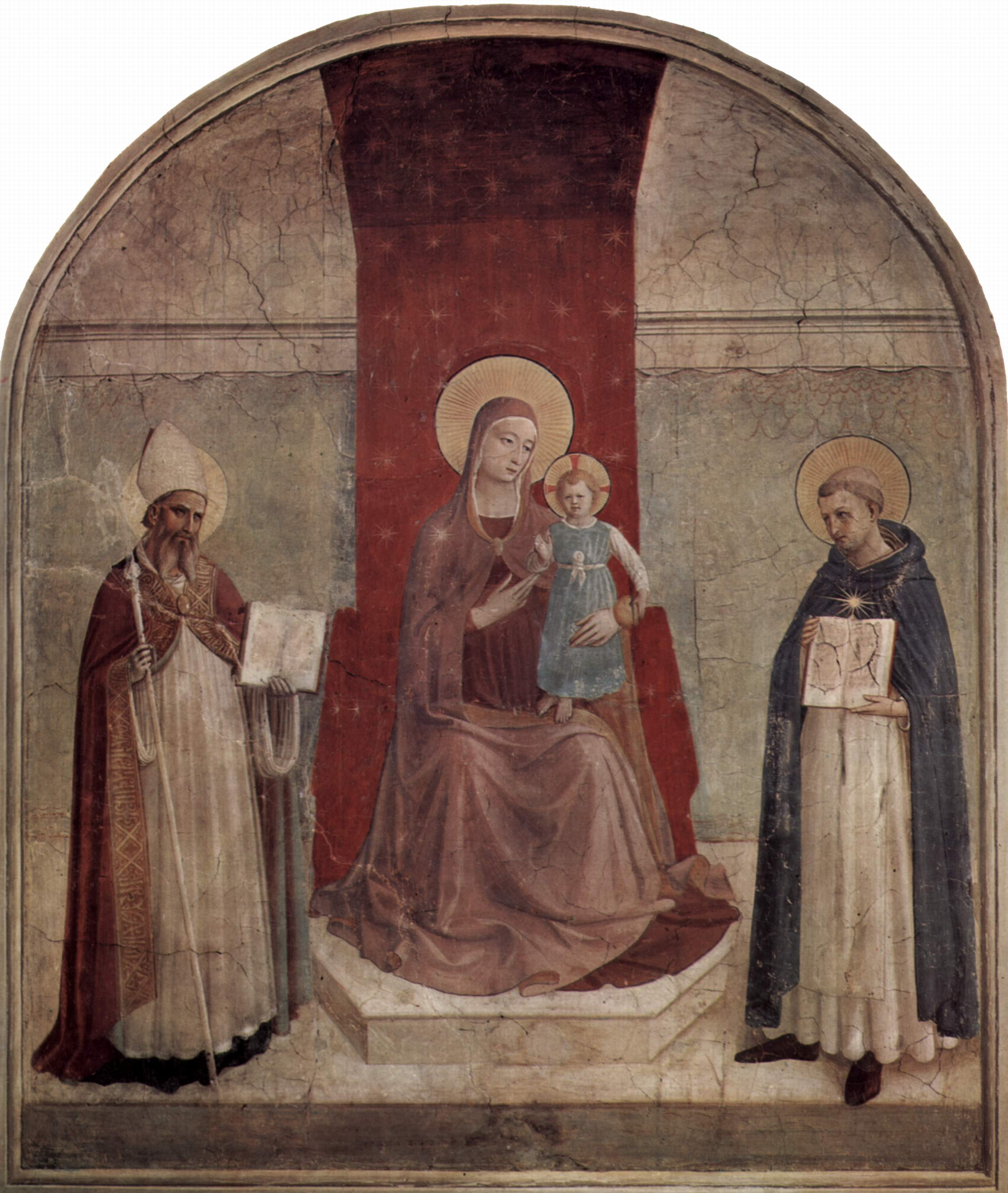
The Madonna with Saint Dominic (right) and Saint Zenobius (left), by Fra Angelico

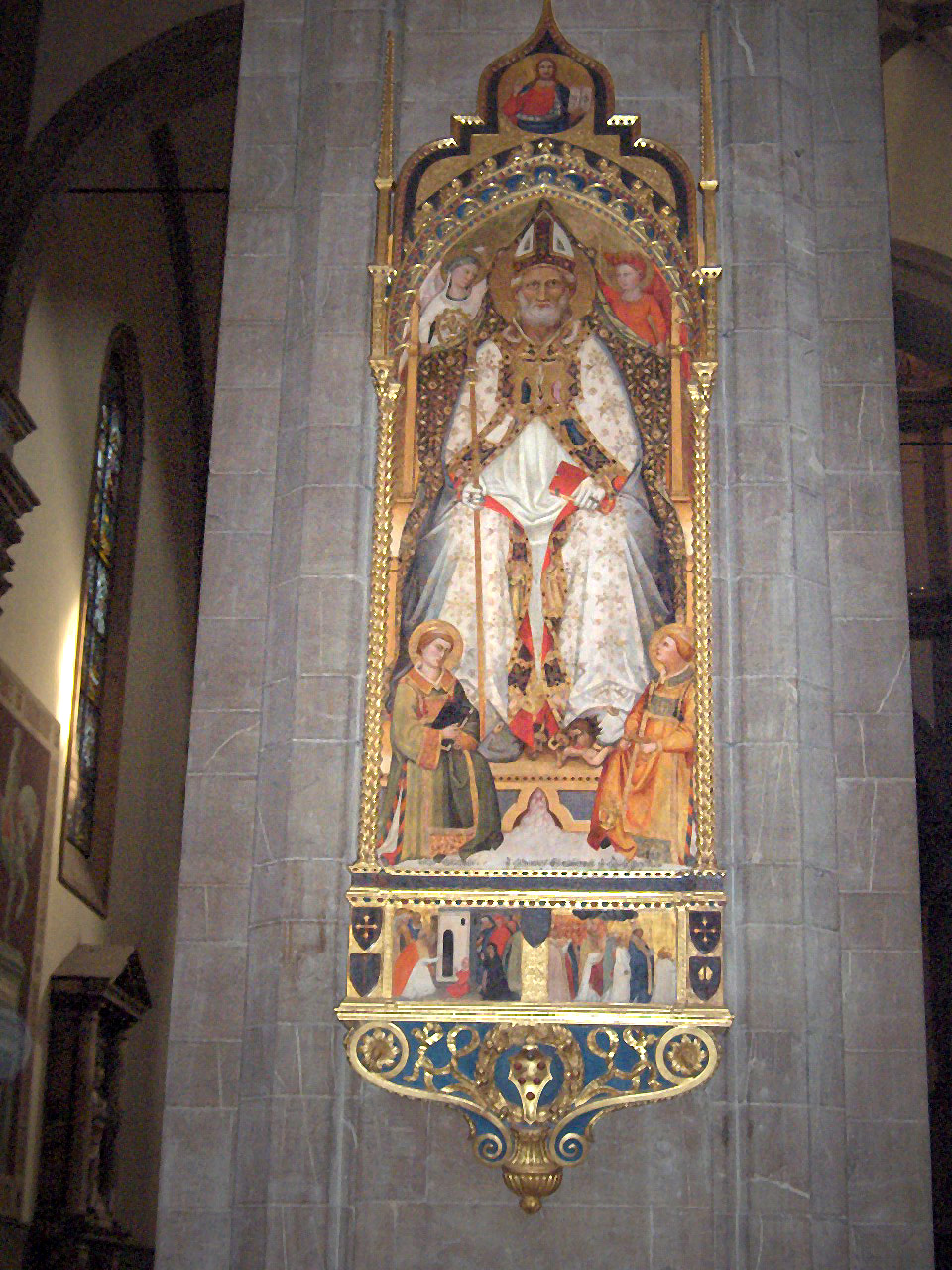
Saint Zenobius seated with his deacons St. Crescentius and St. Eugenius kneeling at either side. Painting on a pillar in the Duomo Santa Maria del Fiore, Florence.

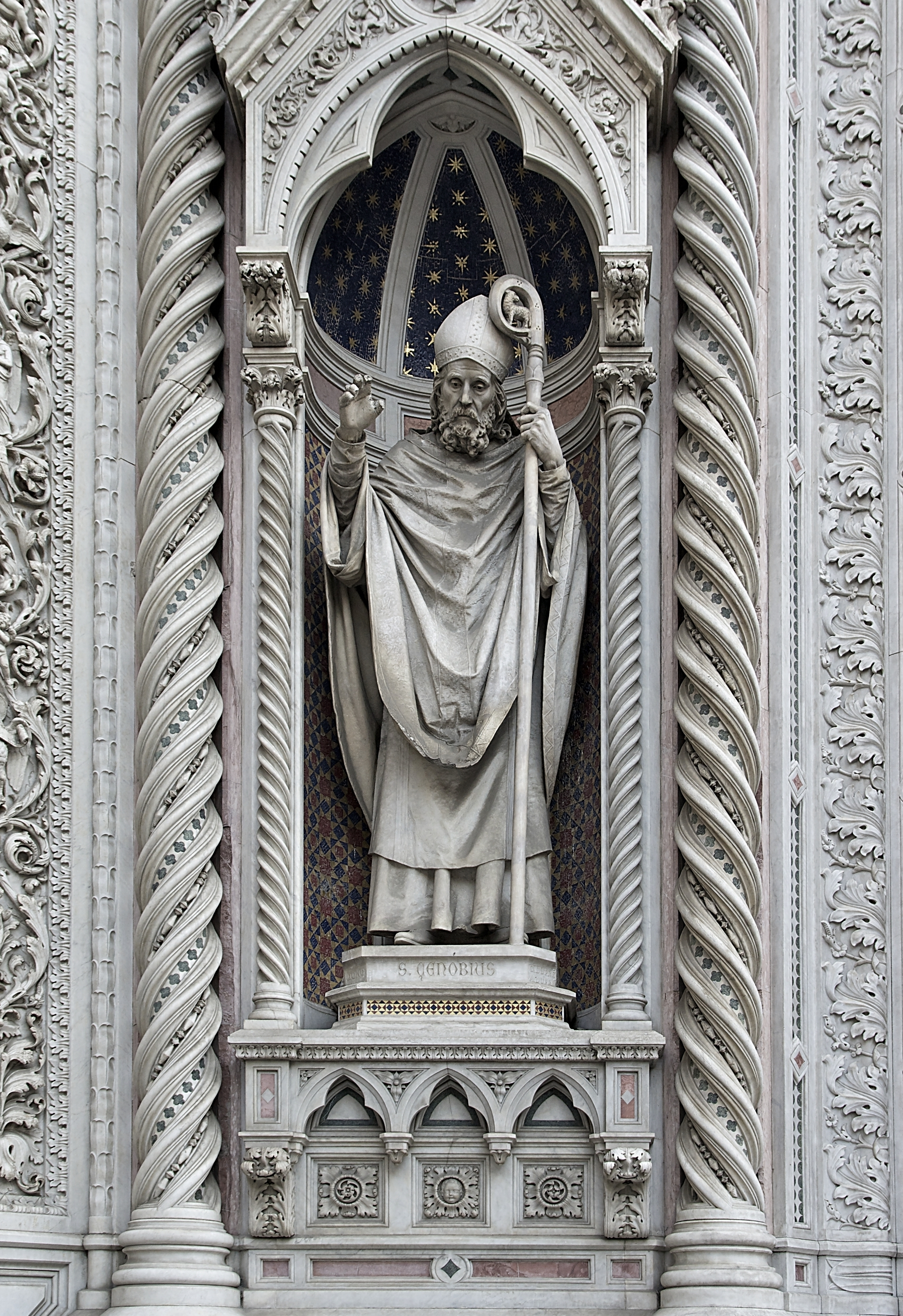
Saint Zenobius, façade of Santa Maria del Fiore, Florence
