= Domenico Veneziano =

Italian Renaissance painter (c. 1410–1461)

Domenico Veneziano (c. 1410 – May 15, 1461) was an Italian painter of the early Renaissance, active mostly in Perugia and Tuscany.

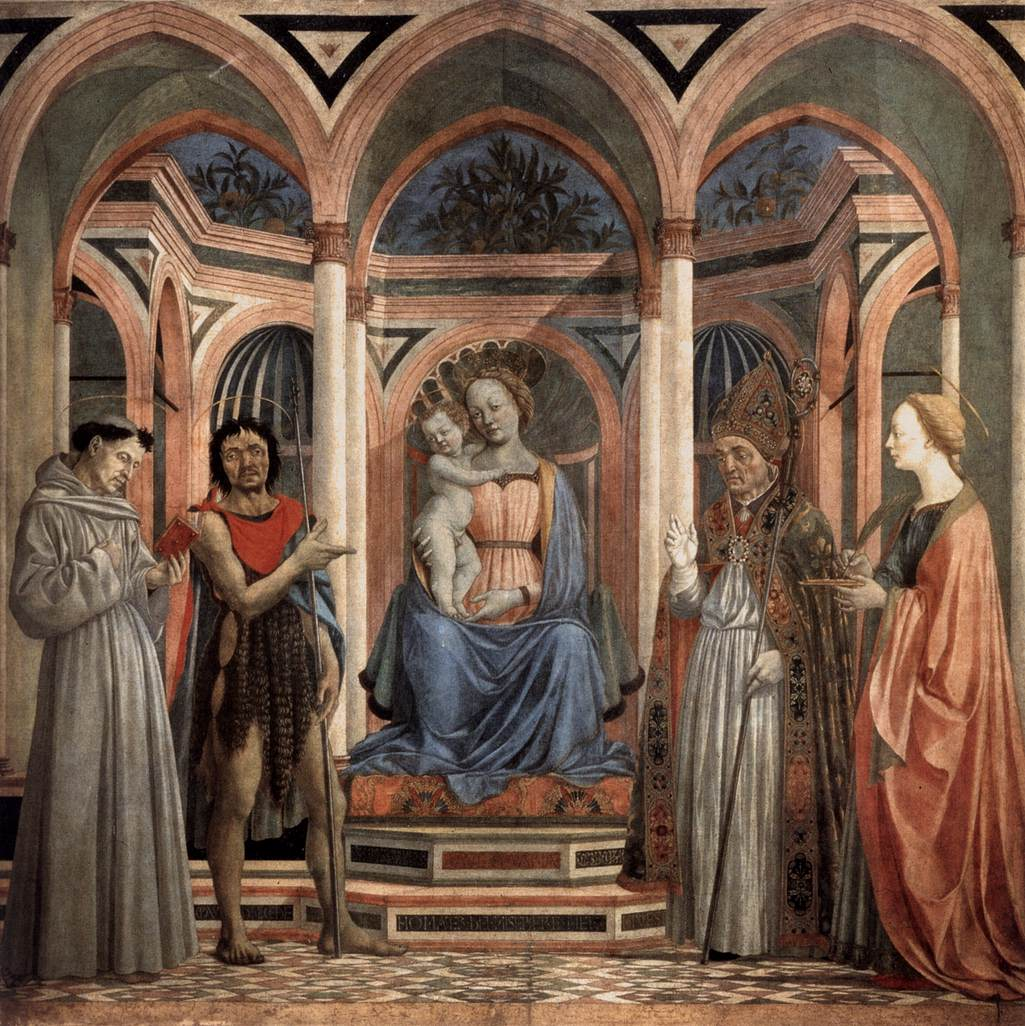
Santa Lucia de' Magnoli Altarpiece, c. 1445–47, tempera on panel, 198 × 207 cm, Uffizi, Florence

Little is known of his birth, though he is thought to have been born in Venice, hence his last name. He then moved to Florence in 1422–23 as a boy, to become a pupil of Gentile da Fabriano. He is said to have worked with Pisanello in Rome around 1423–1430. His work was influenced by the style of Benozzo Gozzoli.

In a letter from him to Piero di Cosimo de' Medici, dated from Perugia in 1438, where he likewise resided for many years, he mentions his long connection with the fortunes of the Medici family, and begs to be allowed to paint an altarpiece for the head of that house. He was a contemporary with Fra Angelico and Fra Filippo Lippi, since those two artists and himself are known to have valued the frescoes of Buonfigli at Perugia. Between 1439 and 1441 he painted a masterpiece of the Adoration of the Magi, a round panel which was probably commissioned for the palace of the wealthy Medici family and is now in Berlin. Another masterpiece is considered to be the Santa Lucia de' Magnoli Altarpiece (c. 1445–1447), originally in Santa Lucia dei Magnoli, Florence and now in the Uffizi. Painted in tempera on panel, the altarpiece displays such an unusual palette for this period that Vasari wrote that it had been painted in oil. He influenced Andrea Mantegna.

Other important works are the Madonna del Roseto in the National Museum of Art of Romania and the Madonna Berenson in the Villa I Tatti in Florence, both dating to around 1432–1437.

Vasari alleged that Domenico was murdered by Andrea del Castagno. However, Castagno died c. 1457, four years before Domenico.

He worked at the decorations of the Portinari chapel in the hospital of Santa Maria Nuova in Florence from 1439–1445, and had as his assistants Piero della Francesca and Bicci di Lorenzo. It is certain that whilst employed there he used linseed oil as his medium, since the hospital books of that date make many allusions to this item in his expenses. His latter days were spent in Florence, where he died on May 15, 1461.

== Predella of the Santa Lucia de' Magnoli Altarpiece ==
Reconstruction of the original predella
| The Stigmata of St. Francis | John the Baptist in the Desert | Annunciation | The Miracles of St. Zenobius | The Martyrdom of St. Lucy |
Left to right: The Stigmata of St Francis; St John the Baptist in the desert; Annunciation; The Miracles of St Zenobius; The Martydom of St Lucy

The predella included panels with scenes of the saints of the main composition, and a central, double-size Annunciation: the Stigmata of St. Francis and John Baptist in the Desert are currently in the National Gallery of Art in Washington, the Annunciation and The Miracle of St. Zenobius are in the Fitzwilliam Museum of Cambridge, and the Martyrdom of St. Lucy is in the Berlin State Museums.

External videos
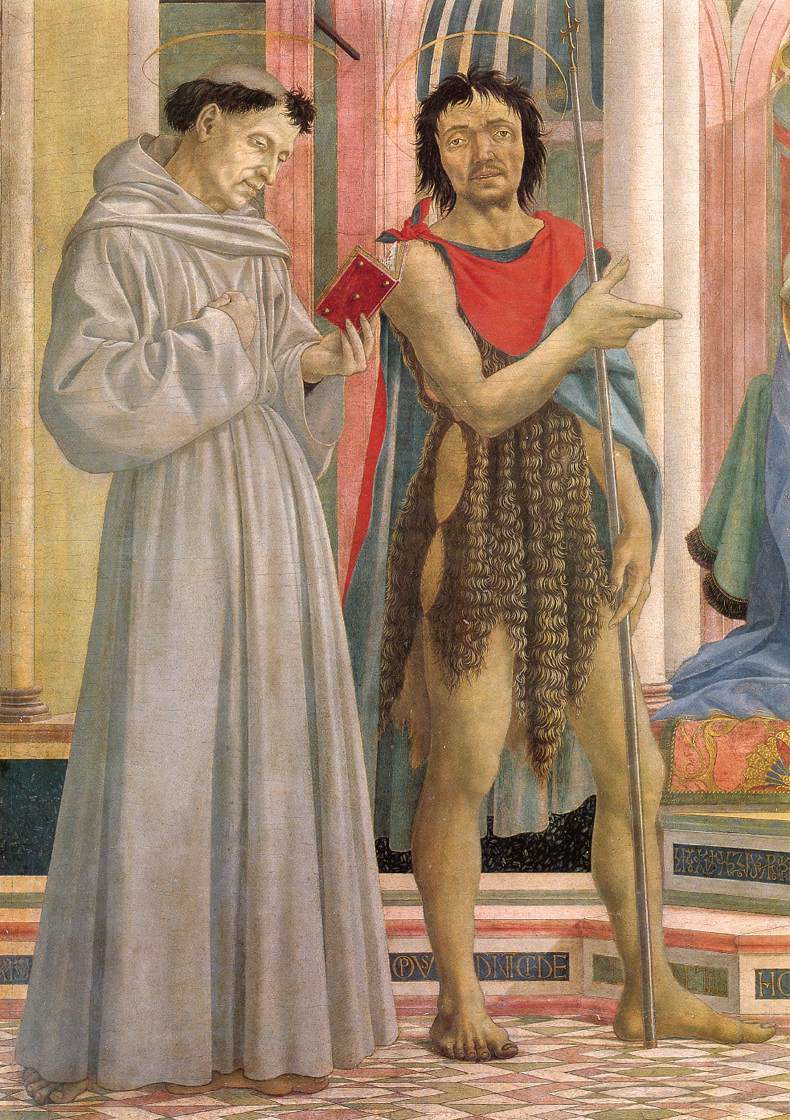
- Veneziano's St. Lucy Altarpiece, Smarthistory
