= The Story of Lucretia (Botticelli) =

Painting by Sandro Botticelli

The Tragedy (Death, Suicide) of Lucretia
- The Botticelli Lucretia
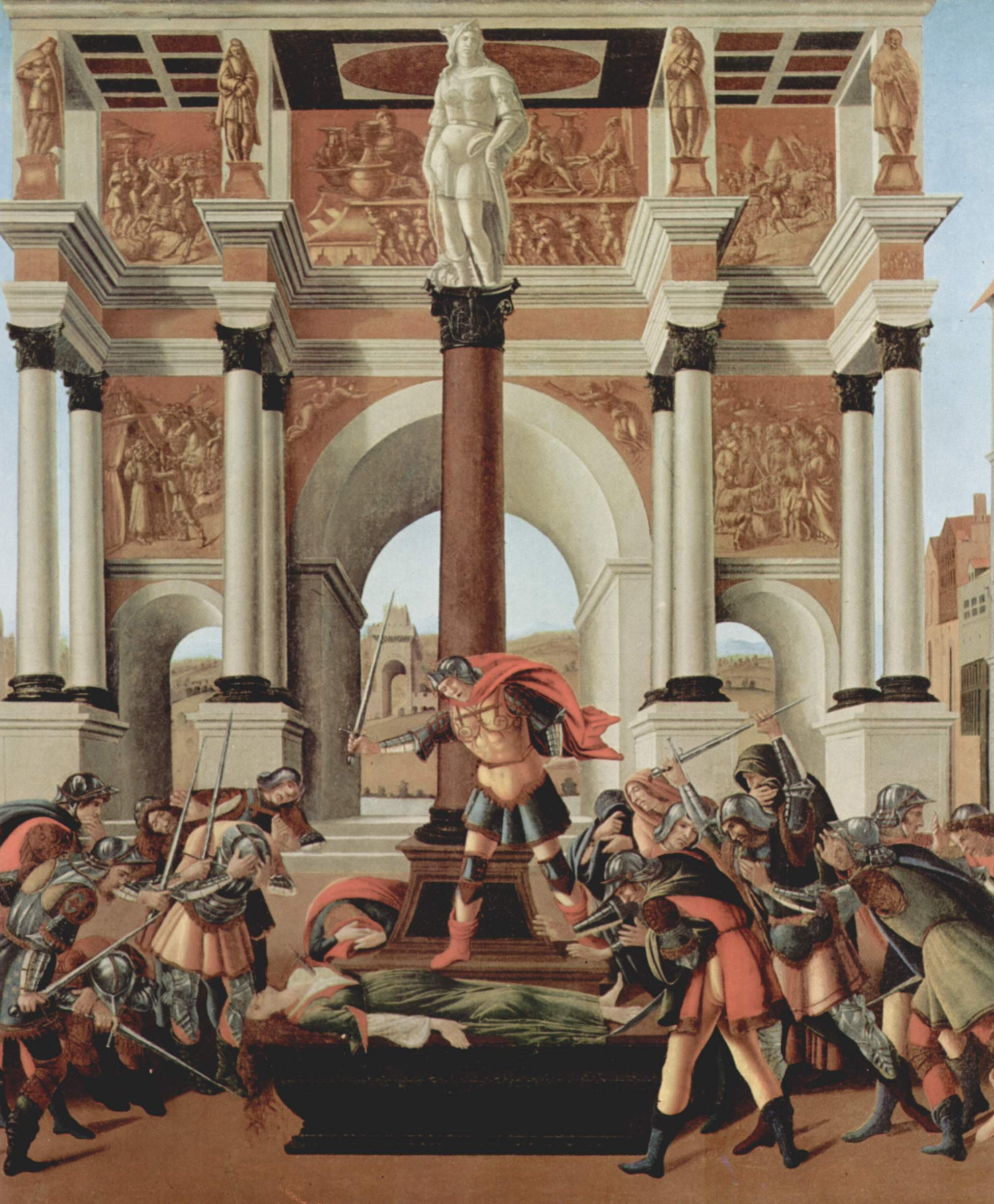
- Central scene
- Artist: Sandro Botticelli
- Year: 1496–1504
- Medium: Tempera and oil on wood
- Dimensions: 83.8 cm × 176.8 cm (33.0 in × 69.6 in)
- Location: Isabella Stewart Gardner Museum, Boston

The Tragedy of Lucretia is a tempera and oil painting on a wood cassone or spalliera panel by the Italian Renaissance master Sandro Botticelli, painted between 1496 and 1504. Known less formally as the Botticelli Lucretia, it is housed in the Isabella Stewart Gardner Museum of Boston, Massachusetts, having been owned by Isabella Stewart Gardner in her lifetime.

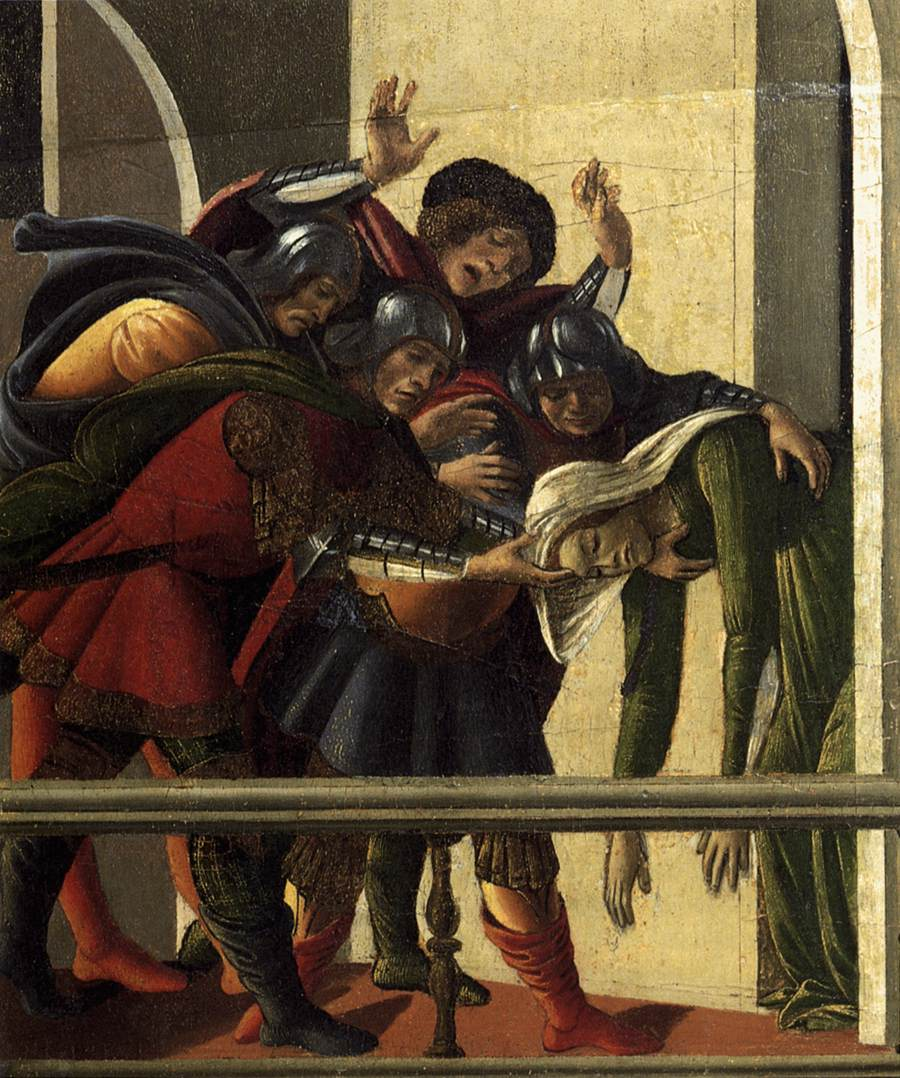
Right-hand scene. While her husband is away, the virtuous Lucretia is raped by Sextus Tarquinius, the king's son. After summoning her husband and others she reveals all and stabs herself.

== The picture of Lucretia's tragedy ==
The picture is a syncretion of scenes from different legendary themes in different time periods that Botticelli considered related. The topic is revolt against tyranny, a popular one in the volatile Italian republics. The main scene is given center foreground. It is the beginning of the revolution that created the Roman Republic. The legend is that Lucretia, a noblewoman, was raped by Sextus Tarquinius, the son of the last king of Rome. As a result, Lucius Junius Brutus took an oath to expel the Tarquinii from Rome and never to allow anyone else to reign. In the centre of the picture Lucretia's corpse is on public display as a heroine. Brutus stands over her exhorting the populace to revolt and recruiting a revolutionary army of young men. There is much sword-waving. The dagger with which Lucretia killed herself is in evidence protruding from her breast. The statue at the top of the column behind Brutus in the foreground is David and Goliath's head, which is not very suitable for vengeance, but does fit the political situation. David and Goliath were a symbol of revolt against tyranny in the Republic of Florence. Lucretia had called for vengeance, but Brutus had called for the ouster of monarchy, and the purpose of the assembly was to implement it.

The legendary funeral oration takes place in the Forum Romanum, but Botticelli makes no effort to represent that well-known place. The setting is a small town, which can be seen trailing into the countryside in the background; some speculate it may have been Collatia, but that place was hardly the scene of a national revolution. None of the buildings are classical Roman and even the triumphal arch in the background commemorating the triumph of the republic is unlike any other. Hilliard T. Goldfarb, author of The Isabella Stewart Gardner Museum: A Companion Guide and History, instead suggests that it is a dramatic stage scene in which the players gesticulate theatrically, and also about Botticelli's intent to convey "a clear political message." One does not, however, hire one of the greatest artists of the time to adorn the inside of a wedding chest or the back of a chair, even in a mansion, with clear political messages; presumably, the panel was meant for public display of some sort. Botticelli ten years later was to die in obscure and unappreciated poverty; nevertheless, he was recognized even then as a great master.

The scene on the right porch is the death of Lucretia. The frieze over the porch depicts Horatius Cocles, a warrior who defended Rome against the intervention of Lars Porsenna and the ousted last king of Rome, Lucius Tarquinius Superbus. The scene on the left porch is the threatening of Lucretia by Sextus to extort her compliance. He rips away her cloak, threatening to plunge his sword into her. The frieze over it depicts Judith and Holofernes, a tyrant decapitated by her after offers of seduction in the Old Testament.

The use of architecture in this picture is parallel to that of Filippino Lippi, a pupil of Sandro's, the son of Sandro's teacher.

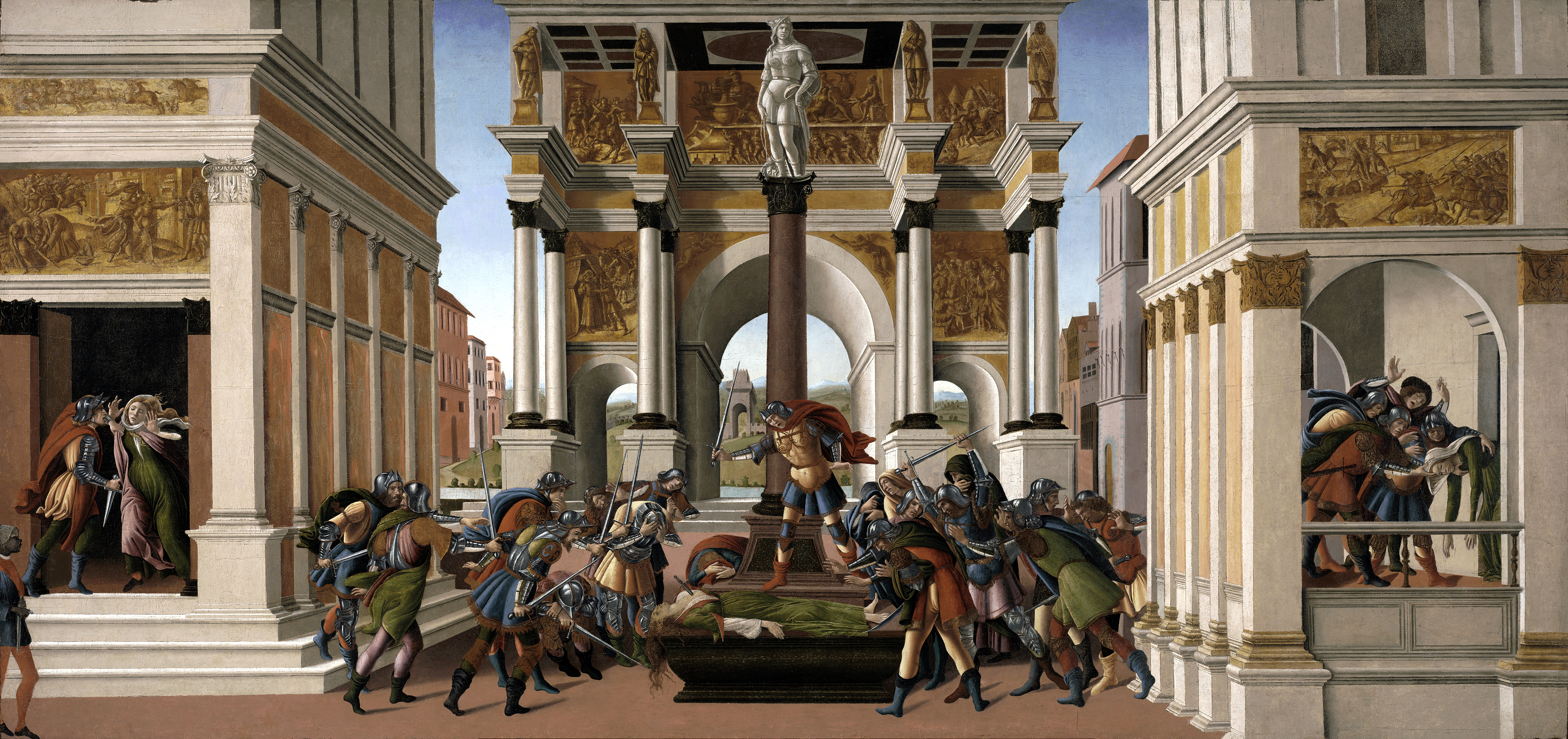
The Tragedy, Death or Suicide of Lucretia

== See also ==
- List of works by Sandro Botticelli
