= Hope (disambiguation) =

Hope is an attitude which combines desire with expectation.

Hope or HOPE may also refer to:

== Theology and mythology ==
- Hope (virtue), one of the three theological virtues in Christian tradition
- Elpis (mythology), the Greek goddess of hope

== Places ==
=== Canada ===
- Hope, British Columbia
  - Hope Mountain, British Columbia
- Hope, Ontario
- Hope, Quebec
- Hope Town, Quebec

=== United Kingdom ===
- Hope, Derbyshire, England
- Hope, Flintshire, Wales

=== United States ===
- Hope, Alaska
- Hope, Arizona
- Hope, Arkansas, the birthplace of former US president Bill Clinton
- Hope, Idaho
- Hope, Illinois
- Hope, Indiana
- Hope, Kansas
- Hope, Kentucky
- Hope, Maine
- Hope, Michigan
- Hope, Missouri
- Hope, New Jersey
- Hope, New Mexico
- Hope, New York
- Hope, North Dakota
- Hope, Ohio
- Hope, Providence, Rhode Island, a neighborhood
- Hope, Dane County, Wisconsin
- Hope, U.S. Virgin Islands, a settlement

=== Other places ===
- Hope Crater, Mars; see List of craters on Mars: H–N
- Hope Bay, Trinity Peninsula, Antarctica
- Hope Harbour, Falkland Islands
- Cape Hope, Greenland
- Hope Bay, Jamaica
- Hope, New Zealand
- Hope Valley (disambiguation)
- Hope Island (disambiguation)
- Hope River (disambiguation)
- Hope Township (disambiguation)
- Hope Historic District (disambiguation)

== People ==
- Hope (given name)
- Hope (surname)

== Arts, entertainment and media ==
=== Literature ===
- Hope (Deighton novel), a 1995 novel in the Faith, Hope, and Charity trilogy by Len Deighton
- Hope (Clapham novel), a 2002 novel based on the TV series Dr Who
- Hope!!, 2002 manga comic chapter; see list of One Piece chapters (187–388)
- Hope: A Memoir of Survival in Cleveland, a 2015 book by Amanda Berry and Gina DeJesus with Mary Jordan and Kevin Sullivan
- Hope (Pope Francis memoir), a 2025 memoir by Pope Francis

=== Film ===
- Hope (1922 film), starring Mary Astor
- Hope (1997 film), a TV film starring Jena Malone
- Hope (2006 film), a Telugu film directed by Satish Kasetty
- Hope (2011 film), a Canadian film
- Hope (2013 film), a South Korean film
- Hope (2014 film), a French film
- Hope (2019 film), a Norwegian film
- Hope (2022 film), an Indian Kannada-language film
- Hope (2026 film), a South Korean film

=== Music ===
==== Groups ====
- Hope (American band), a 1969–1972 Christian rock group
- Hope (English group), a 2007–2009 girl group, finalists in series 4 of The X Factor

==== Albums ====
- Hope (The Blackout album) or the title song, 2011
- Hope (Harem Scarem album) or the title song, 2008
- Hope (Hillsong album), 2003
- Hope (Hugh Masekela album), 1994
- Hope (Klaatu album) or the title song, 1977
- Hope (Lionel Loueke and Kevin Hays album), 2017
- Hope (Manchester Orchestra album), 2014
- Hope (Meg Mac album) or the title song, 2019
- Hope (NF album), 2023
- Hope (Non-Prophets album), 2003
- Hope (Petra album), 2026
- Hope (Shamir album) or the title song, 2017
- Hope (Silent Border album) or the title song, 2007
- Hope (The Strumbellas album), 2016
- Hope (Susan Boyle album), 2014
- Hope (Swallow the Sun album) or the title song, 2007
- Hope (Toshiko Akiyoshi album) or the title song (see below), 2006
- Hope (War Child album), a compilation produced by the UK charity, 2003
- Hope, by Betty Buckley, 2018
- Hope, by iamnot, 2017
- Hope, by Michael English, 1993
- Hope, by Sigma, or the title song, 2022
- Hope, by Third Party, 2017

==== EPs ====
- Hope (Hawthorne Heights EP) or the title song, 2012
- Hope (Palace Songs EP), 1994
- Hope, by Dream On, Dreamer, 2010

==== Songs ====
- "Hope" (The Chainsmokers song), 2018
- "Hope" (David Campbell song), 2003
- "Hope" (Jack Johnson song), 2008
- "Hope" (NF song), 2023
- "Hope" (Our Lady Peace song), 1994
- "Hope" (Stefan song), 2021
- "Hope" (Toshiko Akiyoshi song), 2006
- "Hope" (Twista song), 2004
- "Hope" (XXXTentacion song), 2018
- "Hope" (instrumental), by Rush, 2007
- "Onara" (song), or "Hope", the theme song for the Korean television series Dae Jang Geum, 2003
- "Hope", by Alien Ant Farm from Truant, 2003
- "Hope", by Apocalyptica from Cult, 2000
- "Hope", by Avail from Satiate, 1992
- "Hope", by Björk from Volta, 2007
- "Hope", by Boris from Attention Please, 2011
- "Hope", by Descendents from Milo Goes to College, 1982
- "Hope", by Fat Freddy's Drop from Based on a True Story, 2005
- "Hope", by Five for Fighting from Slice, 2010
- "Hope", by Gaëtan Roussel from Trafic, 2018
- "Hope", by Golden Earring from Seven Tears, 1971
- "Hope", by Nas from Hip Hop Is Dead, 2006
- "Hope", by R.E.M. from Up, 1998
- "Hope", by Sevendust from Chapter VII: Hope & Sorrow, 2008
- "Hope", by Shaggy from Hot Shot, 2000
- "Hope", by Shinedown from Planet Zero, 2022
- "Hope", by Strapping Young Lad from The New Black, 2006
- "Hope", by Take That from Wonderland, 2017
- "Hope", by Vampire Weekend from Only God Was Above Us, 2024
- "Hope", by Volumes from Different Animals, 2017
- "Hope", by the Weather Girls from Success, 1983
- "Hope", by We Came As Romans from Tracing Back Roots, 2013
- "Hope", from the musical Zorro, 2008
- "Hoping", by X Ambassadors, 2017

=== Visual art ===
- Hope (Burne-Jones), an 1896 painting by Edward Burne-Jones
- Hope (Pollaiuolo), a 1470 painting by Piero del Pollaiuolo
- Hope (Watts), an 1886 painting by George Frederic Watts
- Hope I, a 1903 painting by Gustav Klimt
- Hope II, a 1907–1908 painting by Gustav Klimt
- Barack Obama "Hope" poster, a 2008 image designed by Shepard Fairey

=== Other arts and media ===
  - Hope Channel Philippines, its Philippine counterpart
- Hope 103.2, a Christian radio station in Sydney, Australia
- Hope! – Das Obama Musical, a German musical based on the life of US president Barack Obama
- Hope Theatre, an English Renaissance theatre built in London in 1614

== Computing and science ==
- Hope (programming language), a small functional programming language
- Hackers on Planet Earth, a biennial conference series sponsored by the magazine 2600: The Hacker Quarterly
- Hamburg Ocean Primitive Equation General Circulation Model, one of the ocean circulation models

== Education ==
- Hope College, Holland, Michigan, US
- Hope High School (disambiguation)
- Hope International University, Fullerton, California, US
- HOPE Scholarship, a university scholarship program in Georgia, US
- Liverpool Hope University, Liverpool, England, UK

== Law and government ==
- Hope (political party), in Slovakia
- Hawaii's Opportunity Probation with Enforcement
- Lespwa (Haitian Creole for Hope), a Haitian political coalition
- Hispanic Office of Planning and Evaluation, a former nonprofit organization in Massachusetts, US

== Transportation ==
=== Ships ===
- Hope (ship), several vessels
- HMS Hope, several ships of the Royal Navy
- SS Hope, an American hospital ship
- USS Hope, several ships of the US Navy

=== Space flight ===
- HOPE-X, a cancelled Japanese experimental spaceplane
- Hope Mars Mission, a space exploration probe by the United Arab Emirates launched in 2020
- Human Outer Planet Exploration, a 2003 NASA proposal for exploring the Galilean moons of Jupiter

=== Other transportation ===
- Hope Motor Company, a Japanese car company
- Hope Aerodrome, Canada
- Hope railway station (disambiguation)

== Other uses ==
- HOPE for New Hampshire Recovery
- Hope (Gardner, Louisiana), an historic house in the US
- Hope (dolphin), a dolphin and subject of the 2014 movie Dolphin Tale 2
- Hope Diamond
- Hope Lodge (disambiguation)
- Hope Luxury, a Philippine brand of cigarette
- Hope (cigarette), a Japanese brand of cigarette

== See also ==
- Hopa, a city in northeast Turkey
- Hope Bowdler, a village and civil parish in Shropshire, England
- Hope Bagot, a hamlet and civil parish in Shropshire, England
- Hope and Change, a 2008 Obama Presidential campaign slogan
- SN H0pe (Supernova Hope), a supernova discovered in 2023
- Lespwa (Haitian Creole for Hope), a Haitian political coalition
- De Hoop (disambiguation) (English: The Hope)
- Hopeful (disambiguation)
- Hopeless (disambiguation)
- Hopetoun (disambiguation)
- The Hope (disambiguation)
