= Hope (ship) =

There have been several ships named Hope:

== Ships named for the virtue/emotion ==
Numerous vessels have been named Hope for the emotion or virtue Hope:

- Hope (1764 ship) was an American brig or sloop that made two voyages in the slave trade.
- Hope (1770 ship) was built at Liverpool, though it is not clear under what name. She first appeared in Lloyd's Register in 1786 as a Greenland whaler. From 1789 on she was a Southern Fishery whaler. As such she made five whaling voyages to Africa or the South Pacific. On the fifth she captured Haasje. Hope was last listed in 1798.
- Hope (1789 brigantine) was an American brigantine that made a maritime fur trade voyage under Captain Joseph Ingraham.
- Hope (1792 ship) was launched in 1792 at Plymouth. In 1793 She had a successful cruise as a privateer, capturing or recapturing some five vessels. On her return to England her owners sold her and she became the Spanish packet Esperanza, sailing between England and Spain. With the outbreak of war between Britain and Spain in 1796 Esperanza disappeared from the registers.
- Hope (1797 EIC ship) was launched on the Thames River. She made seven voyages for the British East India Company (EIC) before she was sold for breaking up in 1816. She was one of the East Indiamen at the battle of Pulo Aura.
- HMS Rattler (1797) was the mercantile Hope that the Royal Navy purchased at Leith in 1797. It initially named her GB No.41, and then renamed her HMS Rattler. The Navy sold her in 1802. She returned to the name Hope and became a merchantman trading with Hamburg, Gibraltar, and lastly, Cowes. She was last listed in 1816.
- Hope (1802 ship) was a small ship launched in 1802. She wrecked at Port Stephens, New South Wales, Australia in 1817.
- Hope (1802 Peterhead ship) was launched at Peterhead in 1802. She was a whaler in the British northern whale fishery for her entire career. She was lost in July 1830.
- Hope (1804 ship) was launched at Calcutta. She made one voyage for the British East India Company (EIC). She continued to trade around India until a French frigate captured her in 1808. She apparently returned to English hands and was renamed Madras Merchant. She was then sold in 1816 at Manila.
- Hope (sloop) is an oyster sloop that was completed in 1948. It is believed to be the last sail-powered oystering vessel built on the Long Island Sound.
- SS Hope was a hospital ship operated by Project HOPE. Hope was originally a US Navy hospital ship, USS Consolation. Consolation was donated to Project Hope in 1958, and under her new name served from 1960 until her retirement in 1974.
- HMS Hope – One of 16 vessels of that name that served the Royal Navy
- USS Hope - one of two vessels of that name that served the United States Navy

== Other ships named Hope ==
- Bob Hope-class vehicle cargo ship
  - USNS Bob Hope (T-AKR-300), lead ship of the Bob Hope-class vehicle cargo ships

== See also ==
- Hoop was a Dutch sailing ship in service since 1597 that sank in 1605 during a storm in the Pacific Ocean. She was travelling from Hawaii to Japan under the command of Admiral Jacques Mahu.
- Hopeship (1994 novel) science fiction novel by Simon Lang
