= Charity =

Charity may refer to:

== Common meanings ==
- Charitable organization or charity, a non-profit organization whose primary objectives are philanthropy and social well-being of persons
- Charity (practice), the practice of being benevolent, giving and sharing
- Charity (Christian virtue), the Christian religious concept of unlimited love and kindness

== Places ==
- Charity, Guyana, a small township
- Charity, Missouri, a community in the United States
- Mount Charity, Antarctica
- Charity Glacier, Livingston Island, Antarctica
- Charity Island (Tasmania), Australia
- Charity Creek, Sydney, Australia
- Charity Lake, British Columbia, Canada
- Charity Island (Michigan), United States

== Arts and entertainment ==
- Charity (play), an 1874 play by W. S. Gilbert
- Charity (novel), third in the Faith, Hope, Charity espionage trilogy of novels by Len Deighton
- "Charity" (song), a 1995 single by Skunk Anansie
- "Charity" (Courtney Barnett song)
- "Charity", a 1912 Cole Porter song - see List of songs written by Cole Porter

=== Television episodes ===
- "Charity" (Dilbert episode)
- "Charity" (Malcolm in the Middle episode)
- "Charity" (Moral Orel)
- "Charity" (The Office)
- "Charity" (Stewart Lee's Comedy Vehicle series 2 episode 1)
- "Charity" (Stewart Lee's Comedy Vehicle series 2 episode 3)

== Paintings ==
- Charity (Pollaiuolo), a 1469 painting by Piero del Pollaiuolo
- Charity (Reni, Florence), a c. 1611 painting by Guido Reni
- Charity (Reni, New York), a c. 1629–1630 painting by Reni

== People and fictional characters ==
- Charity (name), an English feminine given name, including a list of people and fictional characters with the name
- Amy Charity (born 1976), American racing cyclist
- Nicole Matthews (born 1987), professional wrestler under the ring name Charity

== Sports ==
- Charity (horse) (1830–?), winner of the 1841 Grand National
- Charity Golf Classic, a tournament on the LPGA Tour from 1973 to 1975
- Charity Cup, an annual association football competition in New Zealand
- Charity Cup, an Australian soccer competition held between 1903 and 1961 - see Football West State Cup
- Charity Bowl, a one-time postseason college football bowl game, played in 1937

== Other uses ==
- Charity Christian Fellowship, also called "Charity Ministries", an Anabaptist group
- HMS Charity, several British Royal Navy ships
- MV Charity, a Cypriot cargo ship briefly in service during September 1972
- Charity Hospital (disambiguation)
- Principle of charity, in philosophy and rhetoric

== See also ==
- Faith, Hope and Charity (disambiguation)
- Little Charity Island, Lake Huron, Michigan, United States
