= Hope House =

Hope House may refer to:

- Hope House (Garden City, Kansas), a historic house in Garden City, Finney County, Kansas
- Hope House (Easton, Maryland), a historic house in Easton, Talbot County, Maryland
- Hope House (Memphis, Tennessee), a nonprofit organization in Memphis, Tennessee

== See also ==
- Hope Residence, a Palm Springs, California house owned by Bob and Dolores Hope
- Hope Lodge (disambiguation)
