= No Hope (disambiguation) =

"No Hope" is a song by The Vaccines.

No Hope may also refer to:

- hopelessness
- Literally, lack of hope
- "No Hope", a song by Red Fang from Whales and Leeches
- "No Hope", a song by The Vaselines from Dum-Dum
- No Hope, No Fear, the third album by Borghesia
- No Hope, No Future, the second album by Good Shoes

== See also ==
- Hopeless (disambiguation)
- Hope (disambiguation)
