= Hopeton =

Hopeton may refer to:

- Hopeton, California
- Hopeton, Virginia
- Hopeton Earthworks, Hopewell culture mounds and earthworks located about a mile east of the Mound City group on a terrace of the Scioto River
- Hopeton Lewis (1947–2014), Jamaican singer

== See also ==
- Hopetoun (disambiguation)
- Hopetown (disambiguation)
