= Hopetown (disambiguation) =

Hopetown or Hope Town may refer to:

- Hopetown, Ontario, Canada
- Hopetown, Northern Cape, South Africa
- Hopeton, California, United States
- Hopetown, Ohio, United States
- Hopetown, British Columbia, a settlement of the Kwakwaka'wakw people in British Columbia
  - Hopetown Indian Reserve No 10A, an Indian Reserve located at Hopetown BC
- Hope Town, a district of the Bahamas
- Hope Town, Quebec, Canada
- Hopetown Darlington, a railway museum in Darlington, England; the area also has the spelling Hope Town
- Hopetown (album), a 2000 album by New Zealand singer-songwriter Dave Dobbyn

== See also ==
- Hopeton (disambiguation)
- Hopetoun (disambiguation)
- Hope Township (disambiguation)
