= Hope River =

Hope River may refer to:

- Hope River (Jamaica)
- Hope River (Tasman) in the South Island of New Zealand
- Hope River (Canterbury) in the South Island of New Zealand
- Hope River (West Coast) in the South Island of New Zealand
- Hope River (Western Australia)
- Hope River (Canada) Chilliwack, British Columbia

== See also ==
- Hope (disambiguation)
- Good Hope River
- Little Hope River
