= Faith, Hope and Charity =

Faith, Hope and Charity or Faith, Hope and Love may refer to:

- The three theological virtues of faith, hope, and charity (or love)
- Saints Faith, Hope and Charity, 2nd-century Christian martyrs and daughters of Saint Sophia
- Faith Hope and Charity (US band), a 1970s disco act
- Faith Hope & Charity (British band), a 1990s British group
- Faith, Hope and Charity, nickname for the three Gloster Gladiator fighter planes flown by Hal Far Fighter Flight RAF during the Siege of Malta in 1940
- Faith, Hope and Charity, three of the fighters flown by No. 1435 Flight RAF in the Falkland Islands
- Faith, Hope and Charity (Montagnais girls), three Montagnais girls adopted by Samuel de Champlain
- Faith Hope Love, 1990 rock album by King's X.
- Faith Hope Love (EP), a 2019 EP by Stan Walker
- Faith + Hope + Love, 2009 Christian album by Hillsong Church
- Fé, Esperanza y Caridad, 1974 Mexican film

== See also ==
- Original names for the Three Sisters (Oregon), volcanic peaks in Oregon, USA
- The three sisters mountains in Canmore, Alberta, Canada.
- Love Hope Faith 2017 country rap album by Colt Ford
- Love Is the Answer: 24 Songs of Faith, Hope and Love, 2004 gospel album by Glen Campbell
- Faith, Hope y Amor, 2013 Latin pop album by Frankie J
- Hope & Faith, US television sitcom first broadcast 2003–2006
- Faith (disambiguation)
- Hope (disambiguation)
- Charity (disambiguation)
- Love (disambiguation)
