= Hospital de la Caridad =

Hospital de la Caridad may refer to:

- Hospital de la Caridad (Algeciras), a former charity hospital in Algeciras, Spain
- Hospital de la Caridad (Seville), a baroque charity hospital building in Seville, Spain

== See also ==
- Charity Hospital (disambiguation), the literal translation of Hospital de la Caridad into English
