= City of Hope =

City of Hope may refer to:

- City of Hope (1991 film), a film taking place in fictitious Hudson City, New Jersey
- City of Hope (1948 film), a French drama film
- City of Hope (organization), a cancer center headquartered in Duarte, California
  - City of Hope (charity), the medical center's charity
- City of Hope, a song by Journey from Eclipse, 2011

== See also ==
- Hope (disambiguation)#Places
