= Brown Elementary School (Berlin, New Hampshire) =

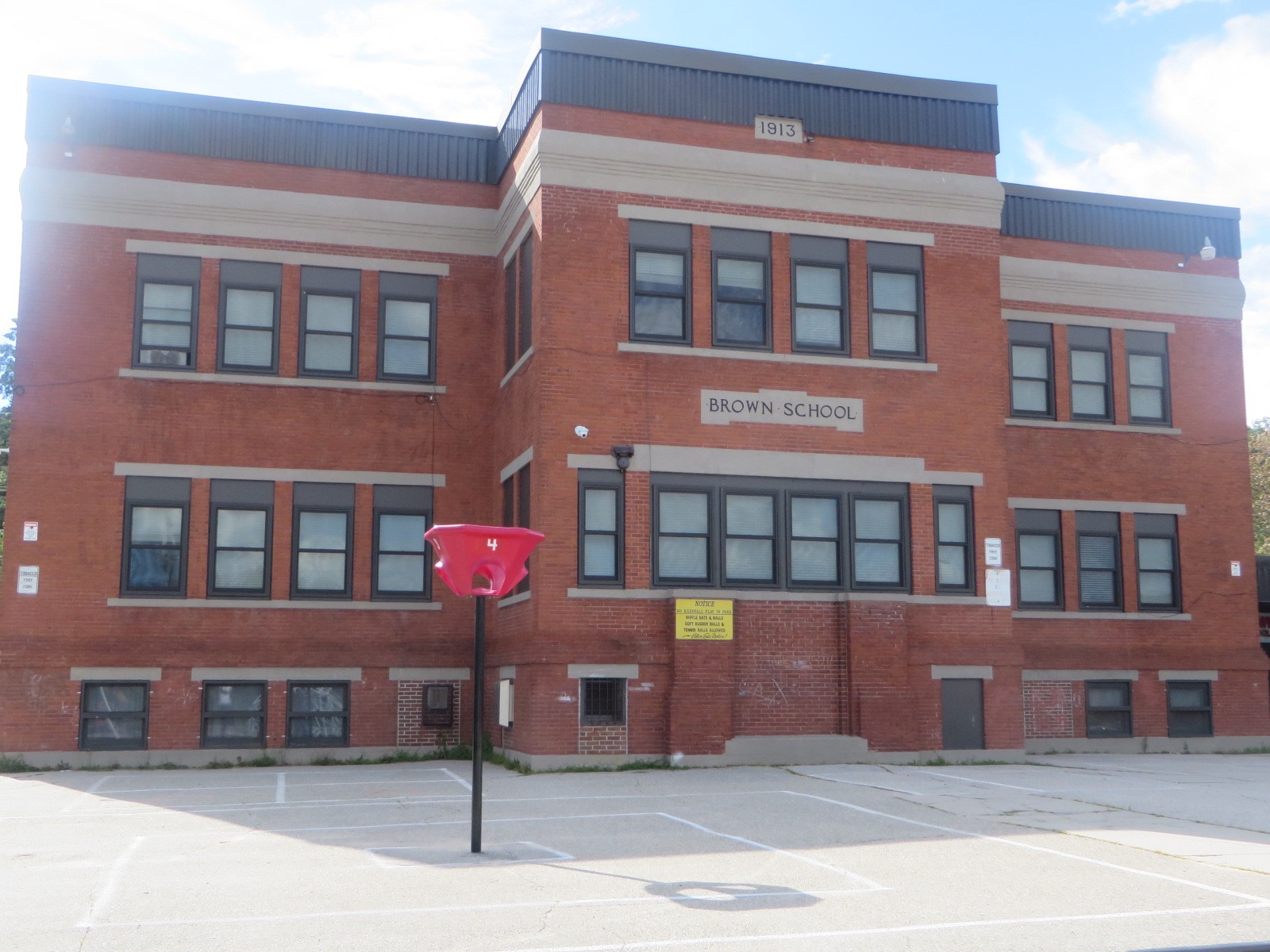
- Brown Elementary School

Location
- 85 Marsh Rd; Berlin, New Hampshire 03570; United States; 44°29′01″N 71°10′06″W

Information
- Type: Public elementary school
- Grades: K–2
- Website: sites.google.com/a/sau3.org/brown-school

Brown Elementary School, known simply as Brown School, is a public school located at 190 Norway Street in northern Berlin, New Hampshire. It houses grades kindergarten through 2nd. In early January 2019, the Berlin School district announced that 2019 would be the last academic school year for the school due to recent state budget cuts.

== History ==
The first Brown School to be constructed was a wooden building that sat on the corner of Main and Fourth Streets, an area that is now a parking lot for HOPE for New Hampshire Recovery Center's Berlin building (formerly a grocery store called Clarkie's Market). The modern brick building was built in 1913, and a wing was built in 1959.
