= Arch Rock (Tasmania) =

Island in Tasmania, Australia

Coordinates: 43°17′S 147°10′E

Arch Rock is a sandstone islet, with an area of 0.44 ha and containing a natural arch, in south-eastern Australia. It is part of the Partridge Island Group, lying close to the south-eastern coast of Tasmania, in the D'Entrecasteaux Channel between Bruny Island and the mainland.

== Fauna ==
Recorded breeding seabird species are Pacific gull and kelp gull. The metallic skink is present.

== See also ==
The other islands in the Partridge Island Group:

- Charity Island
- Faith Island
- Hope Island
