= Charity Island =

Charity Island may refer to:

- Charity Island (Michigan), United States
- Charity Island (Tasmania), Australia

== See also ==
- Little Charity Island, Lake Huron, Michigan
