= Forlorn Hope (disambiguation) =

Forlorn Hope may refer to:

- Forlorn hope, a group of soldiers tasked with leading the vanguard in a military advance, where the risk of casualties is extremely high
- Forlorn Hope, a group of pioneers that set out from Truckee, California to seek help for the Donner Party
- Forlorn Hope (boat), the 1865 voyage of an open boat along the Western Australian coast
- Hopeton, California, an unincorporated community in Merced County, California, formerly known by the names Forlorn Hope and Hopetown
- A song by After Forever on the album Decipher
