= Hope Township, Michigan =

Hope Township is the name of some places in the U.S. state of Michigan:

- Hope Township, Barry County, Michigan
- Hope Township, Midland County, Michigan

== See also ==
- Hope Township (disambiguation)
