= Temperance (Pollaiuolo) =

1470 painting by Piero del Pollaiuolo

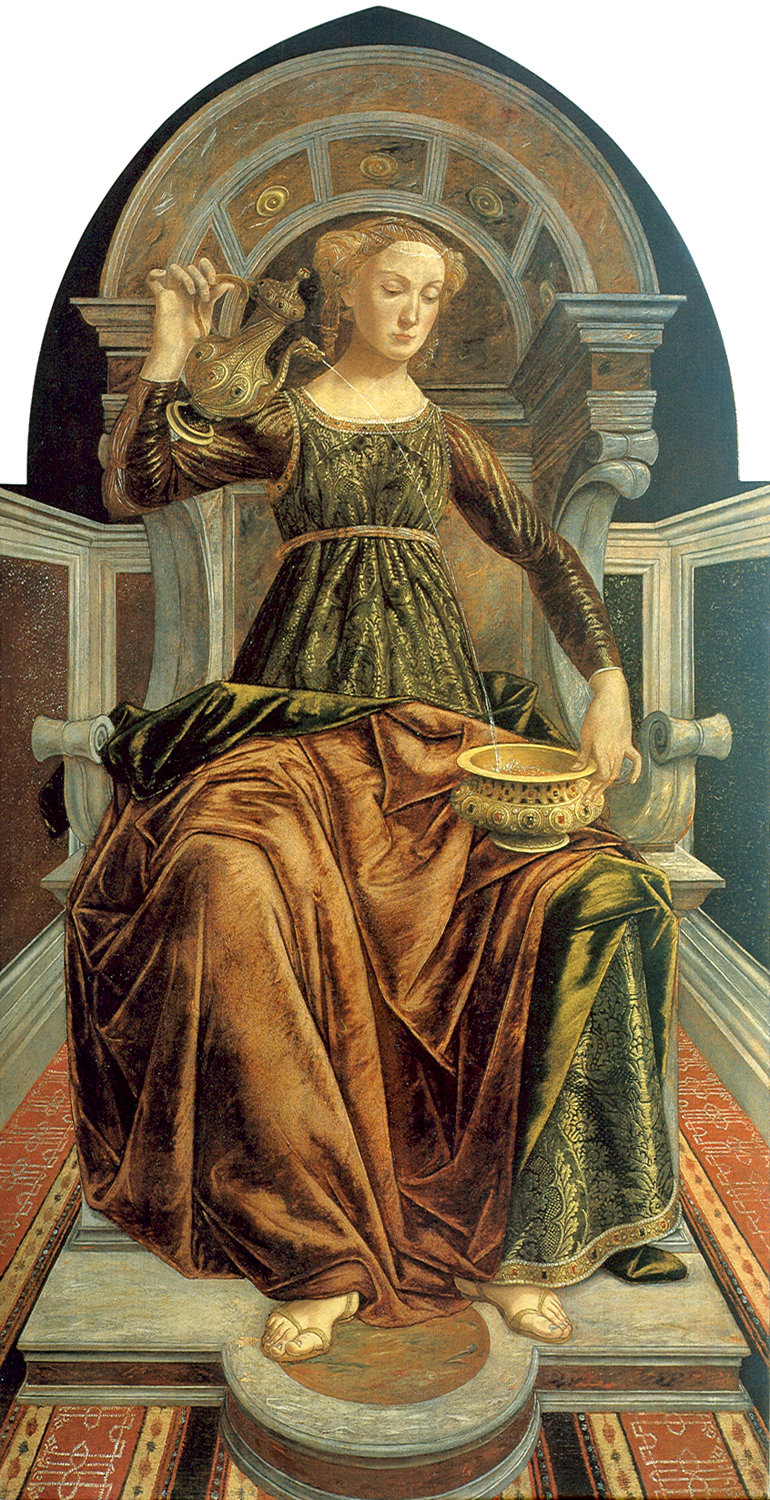
Temperance (1470) by Piero del Pollaiuolo

Temperance is a 1470 oil on panel painting by Piero del Pollaiuolo, now in the Uffizi in Florence. It represents Temperance, one of the seven virtues of the Catholic Church.

== History ==
Florence's Tribunale della Mercanzia (the body overseeing all the city's guilds) commissioned the artist to paint seven works portraying the cardinal virtues in a contract dated 18 August 1469. They were intended to decorated the seat-backs in its audience hall on piazza della Signoria. Charity was the first painting to be completed and was delivered in December 1469.

The commission was temporarily transferred to Botticelli, probably after a delay by Pollaiuolo. Botticelli produced Fortitude before loud protests from Pollaiuolo and his brother Antonio led to a second contract returning the commission to Piero and his studio to produce the remaining six works in the series. In completing it, it is unclear how much of a contribution Antonio made to Piero's work and some art historians have attributed it instead entirely to Antonio. Billi, Albertini and Cruttwell argue from documents that the whole cycle was by Piero, whereas Ullman and others attribute all six works to Antonio based on stylistic comparisons with the few signed works by Antonio, including prints. Yet others attribute the composition of the work to Antonio but the paintings themselves to Piero.

After the magistracy moved into the Uffizi, the paintings were exhibited in the gallery from 1717 onwards after the Tribunale was suppressed. In the 19th century the works were in such a poor state of conservation that only Prudence was exhibited.
