= The Hope =

The Hope may refer to:

== Music ==
- The Hope (Magle), a 2001 choral work by Frederik Magle
- The Hope, a 2021 album by Ferocious Dog
- The Hope, a 2007 album by Sign
- Hatikvah ("The Hope"), the national anthem of Israel
- "La Espero" ("The Hope"), an Esperanto anthem

== Other uses ==
- The Hope (film), a 1920 comedy film
- The Hope (novel), a 1993 novel by Herman Wouk
- The Hope (sculpture), an outdoor sculpture by Nicky Imber in Israel
- The Hope, Smithfield, a historic public house in London, England
- The Hope (Hunda), a bay of the Orkney Islands

== See also ==
- Hope (disambiguation)
