= Fortitude (Botticelli) =

Painting by Sandro Botticelli

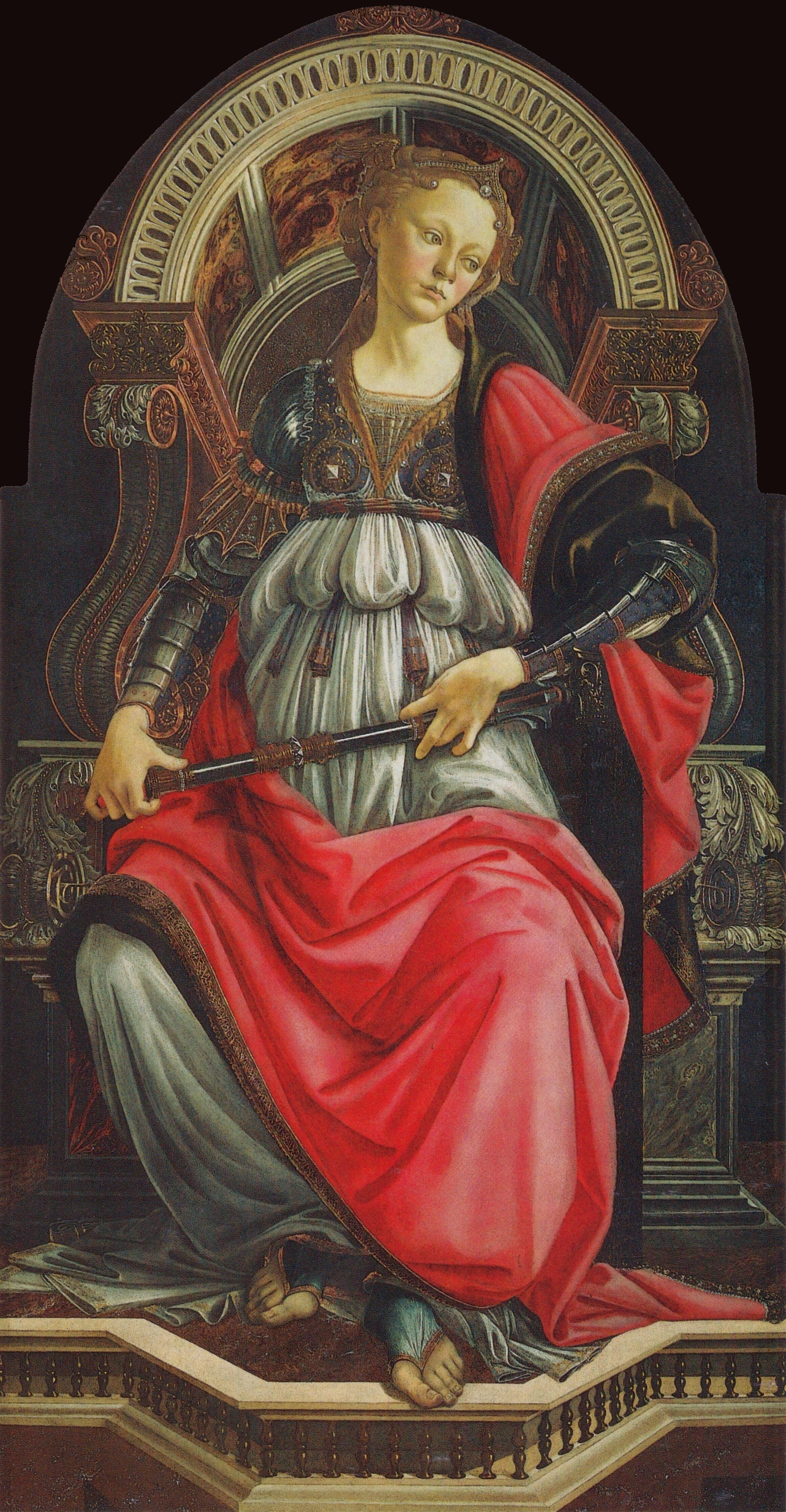
- Artist: Sandro Botticelli
- Year: 1470
- Medium: Tempera on panel
- Dimensions: 167 cm × 87 cm (66 in × 34 in)
- Location: Uffizi, Florence

Fortitude, detail of her face

Fortitude (Italian: Fortezza) is a painting by the Italian Renaissance master Sandro Botticelli, finished in 1470. Housed in the Galleria degli Uffizi, in Florence, Italy, Fortitude was the first recorded masterpiece by Botticelli.

This work originally belonged to a set of seven panels representing Virtues, intended to decorate the Tribunal Hall of Palazzo della Signoria in Florence. The other six panels are painted by Piero del Pollaiuolo's workshop. Unlike the other panels in the cycle, painted on cypress wood, the Fortitude is painted on poplar, a more commonly used wood for painting on panels in Tuscany.

The 167 × 87 centimeter painting was produced with tempera paint on a wood panel. Tempera paint consists in mixing the dry powdered colors with yolk of egg, slightly thinned with acetic acid or water, instead of mixing the colors with oil or varnish as in the case of oil painting. The colors thus mixed are usually laid on a priming of gesso, though other grounds may be used.

The woman represented in Fortitude could be Lucrezia Donati.

== Composition ==
Upon first glance, the eye is pulled to the most illuminated point of the painting: the face of Fortitude. Her gaze is turned down and away from the observer and because of this, her expression is perceived as passive and uninterested. This was a characteristic feature of Botticelli's female figures. It is a fascinating contrast to the theme of the title because if she represents strength, why does she express otherwise? This work, which is one of seven virtues, was intended to be placed high upon a wall. This would be higher than the eye level of the viewer, therefore requiring them to look upward. In the line-up of all seven paintings of the virtues, Fortitude is the first. Perhaps her gaze is intended to literally and figuratively watch over the other virtues as well as the viewers. Without strength, one can never fathom taking on the other six virtues.

The most striking color in the work is Fortitude's red robe, which is draped off one shoulder and laid across her lap. Tempera paint is incapable of producing the hard and cutting edges that occur in oil painting, and this because of a very remarkable property, namely, the comparative transparency of even opaque colors when mixed with yolk of egg. Thus, in some cases, one may find a robe painted in the following manner. The color red is associated with the extremes of emotion, such as passionate love, anger, rage, and violence, and can be symbolic of strength in overcoming hardship. The contrast of the folds in her clothing to her metallic armor creates a play on themes of masculinity versus femininity. She appears regal and delicate while also maintaining vigor and bravery. Strength is not a quality subjective to sex.

The linear perspective of the painting also adds to the regal impression of Fortitude. Having her centered, pushed forward to the picture plane, and sharply lit focuses the viewer solely on the virtue she represents. In early Italy, Fortuna was the name of the goddess who controlled the destiny of every human being. Fortuna was originally “she who brings,” the goddess who permitted the fertilization of humans, animals, and plants; thus was she worshiped by women desiring pregnancy, and the gardeners seeking bumper crops. Though Fortitude's overall complexion is virtually perfect, there is one element of her face that conveys some sort of hardship. This is the discoloration that rests under her eyes. This slight bluish tint transmits a message to the observer that Fortitude has seen misfortune. It adds an element of humanism that is relatable to any passerby that sets their gaze upon this Botticelli piece.

== Meaning ==
To a fifteenth-century audience, the Seven Heavenly Virtues represented a combination of philosophical and religious influences. According to Pseudo-Dionysius, an early Christian writer, the Virtues are "bestowers of grace and valor," represent the "out-pouring of divine energy," and are "possessed of unshakable virility.” During the Renaissance, allegory was used towards the Christian doctrine of salvation. This resulted in a broader application of philosophical systems and social wonders. Botticelli was an admirer of both influences. His works abound with sophisticated reflections of his knowledge and deep appreciation of literature including – besides Dante – the Bible, Livy, Ovid, St. Augustine, Boccaccio, Alberti, and Poliziano. In Renaissance art and culture, personifications that had taken on unclassical appearances during the Middle Ages were restored to classical forms – such as the idealization of the human figure – but also retained some aspects of medieval imagery. The medieval use of differentiated virtues (virtutes) was replaced by that of Virtue in general (with a recollection of the antique virtues), personified first by Hercules, later (c. 1510) as a female figure sitting or standing on a rectangular block to emphasize her stability. This exact personification can be seen in Botticelli's Fortitude Virtue. Even while sitting, Fortitude has a slight contrapposto in her positioning. Her upper body weight is leaning on one arm while she also has one foot slightly shifted forward than the other. This posture creates a forward-moving energy that seems as if she will rise up from her throne and join the observer viewing her. Botticelli's Virtue also stands out for the different type of marble bench, with its richer engraved decorations.

== History ==
The cycle was for the Tribunal Hall of Piazza della Signoria in Florence. The Tribunale di Mercanzia was the body that decided on the business disputes between Florentine merchants and administered justice among the guilds, known as Arts. Later, these panels would be moved to the Uffizi, when the wealth and heritage of the Renaissance judiciary were absorbed by the Chamber of Commerce in 1777. At the time of their commission in the fifteenth century, the Mercanzia was of prime importance in Florence's economic life. This made the commission extremely prestigious, and the job was sought by many painters. Pollaiolo's understandable protests to Botticelli's involvement, contributed to limiting Botticelli's participation in the commission to this single figure. Botticelli could count on the help of Tommaso Soderini, one of the Mercanzia commissioners, and because of his intrusion, the painters’ guild amended their statutes to protect its members from other outside interference. Soderini was one of the most prominent members historically of an influential Florentine patrician family and was elected as gonfalonier for life in 1502.

== Rest of the set ==
Piero del Pollaiuolo's six paintings, all also now in the Uffizi, were:

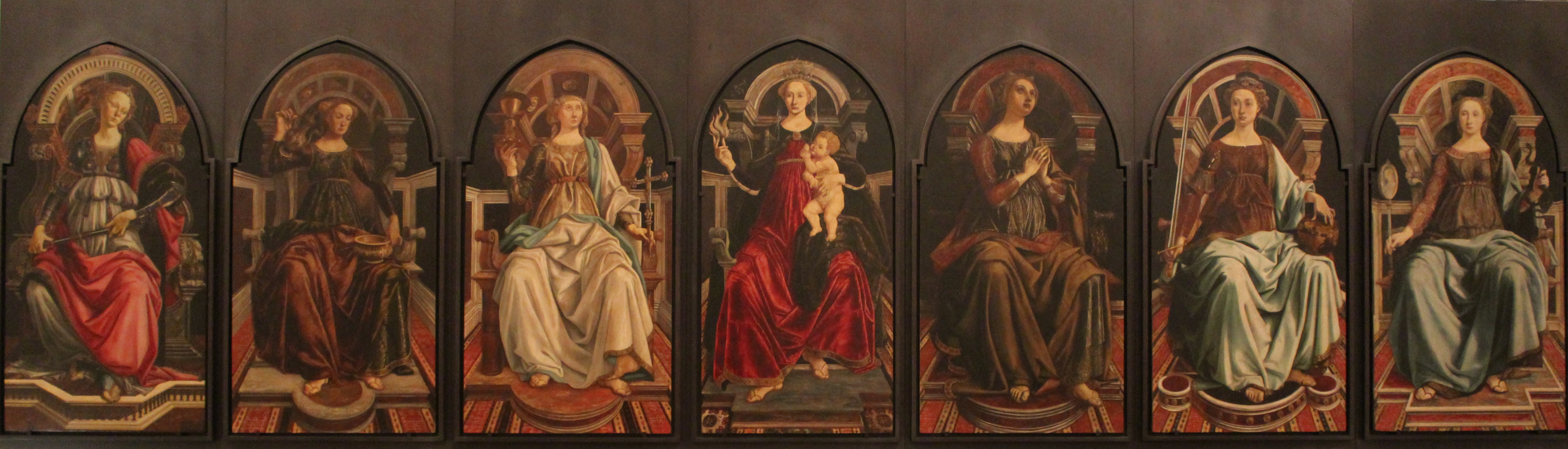
The Seven Virtues by Botticelli and Pollaiolo's workshop

- Charity
- Faith
- Temperance
- Prudence
- Hope
- Justice

== See also ==
- List of works by Sandro Botticelli
