= Hope Island =

Hope Island may refer to:

== Places ==
=== Antarctica ===
- Hope Island (Graham Land), an island on d'Urville Island
- Nadezhdy Island (Hope Island)

=== Australia ===
- Hope Island, Queensland, a suburb of Gold Coast City
- Hope Island (Tasmania)
- Hope Islands (Queensland), islands that form part of Rossville, Shire of Cook
  - Hope Islands National Park, a national park on these islands

=== Canada ===
- Cape Hope Islands, Nunavut
- Hope Island (Ontario)
- Hope Island (British Columbia)

=== Greenland ===
- Kangeq, Greenland, a settlement formerly known as the Island of Hope (Danish: Håbets Ø)

=== India ===
- Hope Island, India

=== Kiribati ===
- Arorae (formerly called Hope Island)

=== Norway ===
- Hope Island, Norway, also called Hopen

=== United States ===
- Hope Island (Maine)
- Hope Island (Rhode Island)
- Hope Island State Park (Mason County, Washington)
- Isle of Hope, Georgia

== Fiction ==
- Hope Island (TV series)
- Home of Gaia in the series Captain Planet and the Planeteers
