= Partridge Island (Tasmania) =

Island in Tasmania, Australia

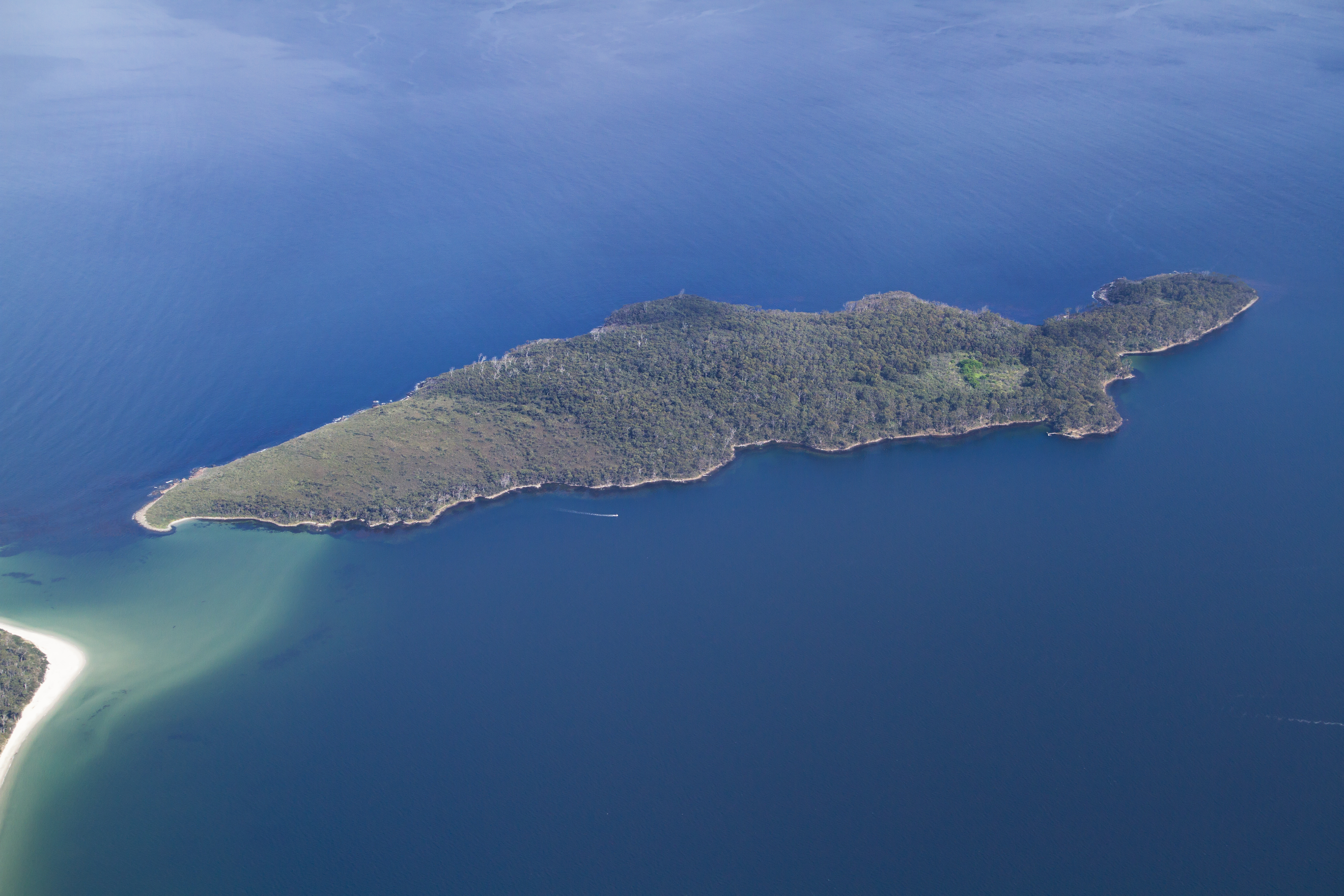
- Partridge Island from the air

- Location within Tasmania

Geography
- Location: D'Entrecasteaux Channel
- Coordinates: 43°24′S 147°06′E
- Archipelago: Partridge Island Group
- Area: 103 ha (250 acres)

Administration
- Australia
- State: Tasmania

The Partridge Island, part of the Partridge Island Group, is an 103-hectare (250-acre) island that lies close to the south-eastern coast of Tasmania, Australia. The island is situated in the D'Entrecasteaux Channel, between Bruny Island and the mainland of Tasmania and is part of the South Bruny National Park.

The other islands in the Partridge Island Group are:

- Arch Rock
- Charity Island
- Curlew Island
- Faith Island
- Garden Island
- Hope Island
- Huon Island
- Satellite Island
- Seagull Rock

== Flora and fauna ==
The vegetation is mainly dry eucalypt forest with a grassy understorey. Little penguins breed on the island. The endangered forty-spotted pardalote is present. European rabbits were introduced to the island but have since been eradicated. The eastern blue-tongued lizard has been recorded.

== Acquisition ==
Blackberries and English ivy have invaded the bush and the jetty has become hazardous. In 1998 volunteers removed approximately four to five metric tons (3.9 to 4.9 long tons; 4.4 to 5.5 short tons) of washed-up rubbish.

== See also ==
- List of islands of Tasmania
- Cyprus mutiny
