= Hope railway station =

Hope railway station may refer to:

- Hope station (Arkansas), in Hope, Arkansas, United States
- Hope station (British Columbia) in Hope, British Columbia, Canada
- Hope railway station (Wales) in Hope, Flintshire
- Hope railway station (England), in Hope, Derbyshire

== See also ==
- Hope (disambiguation)
- Hope Exchange railway station, Flintshire, Wales closed 1958
- Hope & Pen-y-ffordd railway station, Flintshire, Wales closed 1962
