= Nicky Imber =

Austrian-born Israeli sculptor

Nicky Imberman (born Ignatz Imberman, Vienna 1920 – 1996) was an Austrian-born multidisciplinary Jewish artist best known for his sculptures on Jewish themes. Grand-nephew of Naftali Herz Imber, whose poem became the text of the Israeli national anthem “Hatikva”.

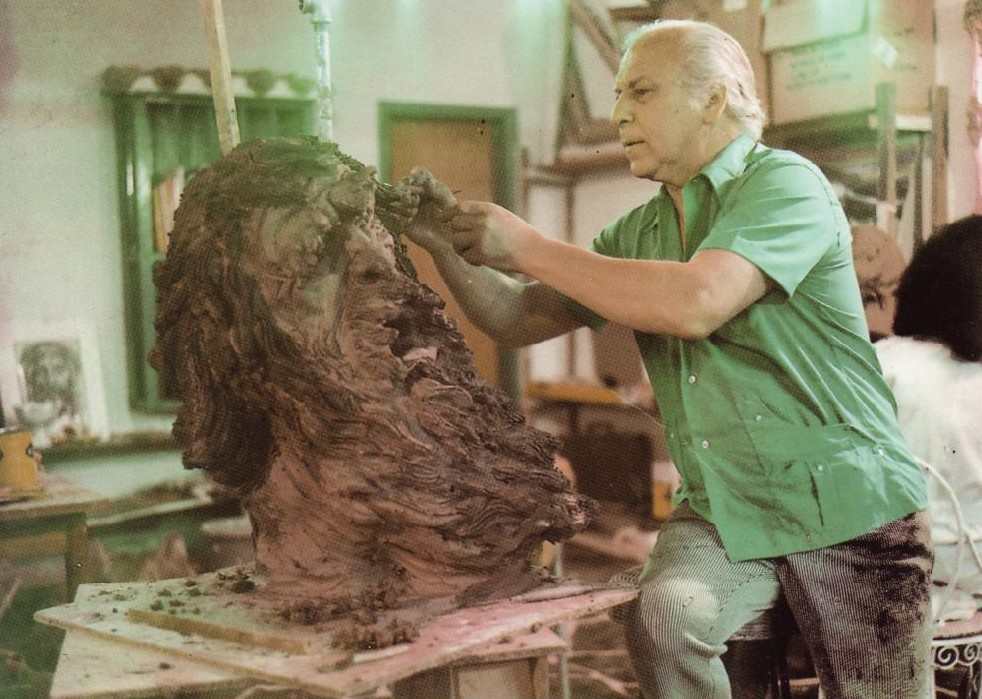
Nicky Imber working on sculpture

After escaping the Nazi concentration camp in Dachau, he pledged to dedicate his art to perpetuating the memory of the Holocaust. Among his more famous works are "The Hope" and "The Love of Torah". His work can be seen around the world, in Northern Israel, the United States, and the Venezuelan Museum of Natural History in Caracas.

== Biography ==
Nicky Imber was born in Vienna, Austria. During his studies at the Academy of Arts in Vienna, he drew anti-Nazi caricatures for Jewish student publications. After several thwarted attempts by the family to leave Vienna, in 1938, in the wake of the 'Anschluss', Imber was deported to Dachau. Witnessing the murders of family and friends, he plotted his escape. After two years imprisonment, in 1940 he boarded a ship headed to Haifa. The ship's passengers were refused entry by the British mandatory authorities and imprisoned in a detention camp in Mauritius.

In 1943, Imber worked out a deal with the authorities for his release by joining the British Army, serving as a war artist and a dental assistant in East Africa. After the war, he opened an art school in Nairobi, Kenya, and worked as a photographer and a safari guide.

In 1949 to 1954, he lived in Venezuela, where he was contracted to do an East African Diorama series. The National Museum added an entire wing to display it.
During this period he got married and had a daughter Raquel, who accompanied and assisted him.

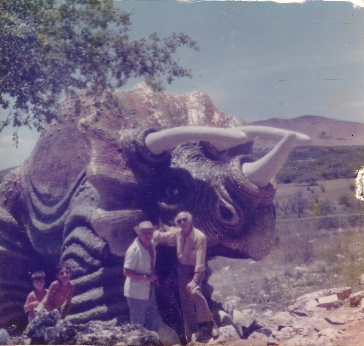
Nicky Imber with one of his prehistoric animal sculptures

In 1959, Imber was commissioned to create sculptures and dioramas for the Haifa Prehistory Museum at Gan Ha-em in Haifa, Israel. In 1960 he returned to Venezuela to restore the Phelps series of Dioramas for the Museum in Caracas.

Between 1961 and 1971 he travelled extensively around Europe and after establishing an international name for himself, returned to the United States. In New York he became famous for his realistic oil paintings of portraits of Aga Khan, Tyrone Power, Ava Gardner, David Ben-Gurion, Golda Meir, Sir Richard Burton and Simon Bolivar.

Returning to Venezuela in 1976, Imber created huge sculptures of prehistoric animals, forming one of the world's largest historical animal parks. During this period he also created realistic sculptures of famous Venezuelans for the country's National Hall of Fame.

In 1978, Imber spent three years designing and building a Holocaust memorial park at the entrance to the city of Karmiel located in the Galilee, entitled 'From Holocaust to Resurrection.' Imber also established animal theme playgrounds around the city.

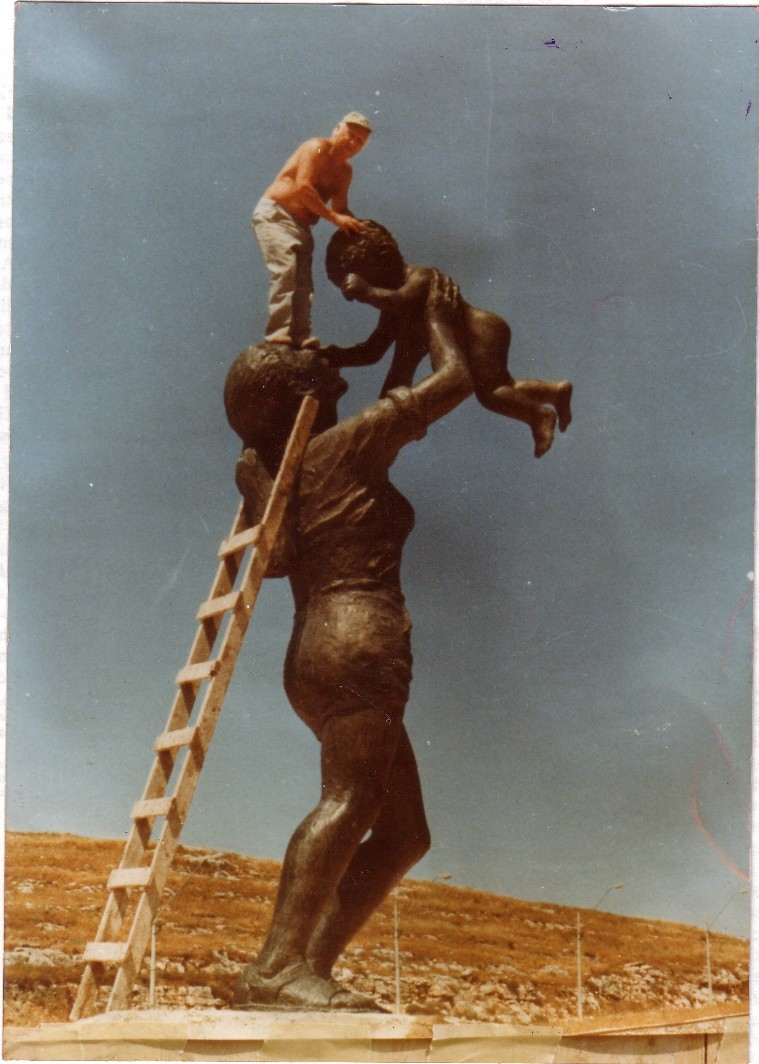
Nicky Imber building "Hope" in Carmiel, Israel

In the 1980s, Imber established residence in Karmiel, Israel. In Israel he was inspired to create highly emotional, life like collections.

Nicky Imber died in 1996 in Vienna, Austria.

== See also ==
- Visual arts in Israel
