= Borghesia =

- Origin: Ljubljana, Yugoslavia (now Slovenia)
- Genres: Gothic rock, EBM, minimal wave
- Years active: 1982–1995; 2009–present
- Labels: Materiali Sonori; Play It Again Sam

Borghesia (Italian: bourgeoisie) is a Slovenian electronic music/rock music group, created in Ljubljana (at the time in Yugoslavia) in 1982. The band was formed by members of the alternative theatre group Theatre FV-112/15. Borghesia created its aesthetics using the imagery of what was prohibited, tabooed, and repressed. Their sound is often compared to that of other groups in the period such as D.A.F., Manufacture, and Front 242, whom many cite as the chief instigators of the Electronic Body Music label used to describe such music.

Borghesia went on several Europe-wide concert tours, mainly in 1988–91, which were reviewed in large music magazines in England, Germany, etc., such as NME, Melody Maker, New Life Soundmagazine, and Zillo. They released four albums on Play It Again Sam, one of the more important indie labels, which were also licensed to Wax Trax in the US and Canada. Further interviews and articles can be found in the aforementioned magazines. Aldo Ivancic later formed the band Bast, and is famous in the Slovenian music scene today as a producer. Borghesia together with Laibach were prominent representatives of Slovenian alternative pop music, and topped the bill on the compilation albums Trans Slovenia Express, released on Mute Records. A Borghesia live show in Gothenburg, Sweden in October 1988 was the subject of a broadcast on Swedish national radio, on the show P3 Live.

== Members ==
- Dario Seraval, vocals (1982–1990, 2009–present), programming (1982–1991, 2009–present)
- Aldo Ivančič, drums, programming (1982–1996, 2009–present)

Touring musicians

- Irena Tomažin, vocals (2011–present)
- Jelena Rusjan, bass (2011–present)
- Andrej Mazi, guitar (2011–present)

== Previous members ==
- Zemira Alajbegović, video (1982–1989)
- Goran Devide, video (1982, died in Maribor in 1988)
- Neven Korda, video (1982–1989)
- Bruno Subiotto, lead vocals (1991–1993, 1996, died in Ljubljana on July 7, 2016)

== Performances ==
- Prisoners
- Bodocniki
- Lustmörder (Cankarjev dom, Ljubljana, 1984),
- Ogolelo mesto (1985)
- Borghesia (1988)

== Discography ==
- Borghesia (1983)
- Clones (1984)
- Ljubav je hladnija od smrti (Zalozba FV, 1985, Italian Materiali Sonori 1985)
- Their Laws, Our Lives (Zalozba FV, 1986, Italian Materiali Sonori 1986)
- No Hope, No Fear (PIAS, 1987)
- Escorts and Models (PIAS, 1988)
- Double Bill, split album with Click Click (PIAS, 1988)
- Naked, Uniformed, Dead (PIAS, 1988)
- Ogolelo mesto (Zalozba FV, 1988)
- Surveillance and Punishment (PIAS, 1989)
- She Is Not Alone (PIAS, 1989)
- Resistance (PIAS, 1989, Jugoton 1989)
- Message (PIAS, 1990)
- 4x12 (Blind Dog Records, 1991)
- Dreamers in Colour (PIAS, 1992)
- Pro Choice (Zalozba FV, 1995)
- 20th Century - Selected Works (double CD) (FV Music, 2009)
- And Man Created God (Metropolis Records, 10 June 2014)
- Proti kapitulaciji (Moonlee Records, 2018)
- Un Chant d'Amour (Final Muzik, 2021)

== Compilations ==
- This Is Electronic Body Music (SPV, 1988)
- Out of Nowhere (Out of Nowhere, 1990)
- Trans Slovenia Express (Mute, 1994)
- Borghesia mfl (Zalozba FV, 1996)
- Tistega lepega dne.../On that beautiful day... (Zalozba FV, 1996)

== Video ==
- Tako mladi/So young (Zalozba FV, 1984),
- Ogolelo mesto/Naked city (1985),
- Triumf zelje/Triumph of the wish (Zalozba FV, 1990),
- Nestrpnost/Intolerance (1992),
