= Faith Island =

Island in Tasmania, Australia

Coordinates: 43°19′S 147°02′E

The Faith Island, part of Partridge Island Group, is a low, flat islet in south-eastern Tasmania, Australia. The islet lies in the D'Entrecasteaux Channel between Bruny Island and the Tasmania mainland. It contains two gravestones, concealed in the scrub in the north-east of the island. Its neighbouring islets are named Charity and Hope and also the Arch Rock.

== See also ==
- List of islands of Tasmania
