= Silent Border =

Swedish rock band

- Silent Border (from left Anders Nordström, Jonas Nilsson, Peter Sjöberg and Sebastian Hidén) in 2006

Background information
- Origin: Säffle, Sweden
- Genres: Rock music Art rock Hard rock Garage rock Alternative rock Experimental rock
- Years active: 2005–present
- Members: Jonas Nilsson; Anders Nordström; Peter Sjöberg; Sebastian Hidén
- Website: www.silentborder.com

Silent Border is a Swedish rock band formed in 2005. Its members are Jonas Nilsson (guitar and lead vocals), Anders Nordström (bass guitar and vocals), Peter Sjöberg (guitar) and Sebastian Hidén (percussion). The band's first public performance was at a UKM talent show in Åmål in 2005, describing themselves, in jest, as "like gladporr but rock" (gladporr is a form of lighthearted/comedic pornographic movies). The music has been described as rock with influences from 1960s rock music, 1970s progressive rock and modern alternative rock.

In July 2007, the band released its first album, Hope, on themselves in a limited pressing. It received mostly favourable reviews in the Swedish media.

== Discography ==
=== Albums ===
- Hope (2007)
