= Hope High School =

Hope High School can refer to:

- Hope High School (Afghanistan), school in Kabul, Afghanistan
- Hope High School (Salford) or Oasis Academy MediaCityUK, an academy in Salford, Greater Manchester, England, UK
- Hope High School (Arkansas), United States
- Hope High School (California), a Los Angeles Unified School District school, United States
- Hope High School (Missouri), part of the Fort Zumwalt School District, United States
- Hope High School (North Dakota), a high school in North Dakota, United States
- Hope High School (Rhode Island) in Providence, Rhode Island, United States

== See also ==
- John Hope College Prep in Chicago, Illinois, United States
