= Hopeless =

Hopeless may refer to:

- Literally, lack of hope
- Depression (mood), a state of low mood and feeling hopeless

Hopeless may also refer to:

== Arts, entertainment, and media ==
=== Music ===
- "Hopeless", a song by The Union Trade
- "Hopeless" (Andy Williams song)
- "Hopeless", a song by Breaking Benjamin from the album Dear Agony
- "Hopeless", a song by Dionne Farris from the soundtrack to Love Jones
- "Hopeless", a song by Tay Kewei
- "Hopeless", a song by Stabbing Westward from the Japanese edition of the album Darkest Days
- "Hopeless", a song by Ringo Starr from the album Old Wave
- "Hopeless", an unreleased song by The Offspring
- "Hopeless", a song by Halsey from the album Hopeless Fountain Kingdom

=== Television ===
- "Hopeless" (Dawson's Creek), a 2001 episode
- "Hopeless" (How I Met Your Mother), a 2011 episode
- "Hopeless" (True Blood), a 2012 episode

=== Other uses in arts, entertainment, and media ===
- Hopeless (2023 film), a South Korean neo-noir thriller film
- Hopeless (2000 film), a New Zealand comedy film
- Hopeless (Roy Lichtenstein), a 1963 oil and acrylic painting
- Hopeless a book by Colleen Hoover
- Hopeless Records, a record label

== See also ==
- Hope (disambiguation)
- Hope
- "Hopelessly", a 1993 pop song by Rick Astley
- Mount Hopeless (disambiguation), various mountains in Australia and one in New Zealand
- No Hope (disambiguation)
