= Capilla de la Caridad (Algeciras) =

Roman Catholic chapel in Villa Nueva, Algeciras, Spain

Coordinates: 36°07′40″N 5°26′52″W

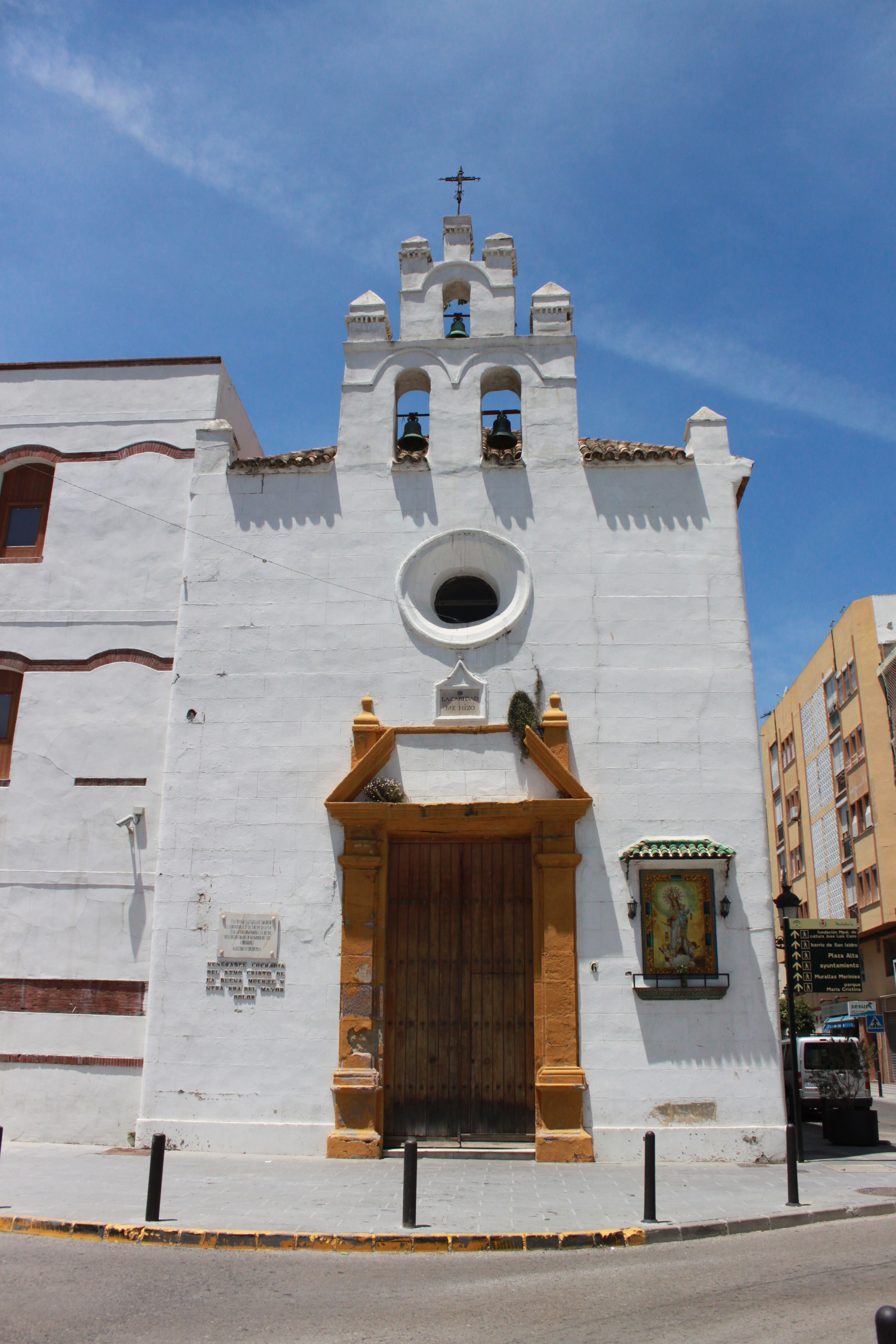
The Chapel of the Charity

The Chapel of the Charity (Spanish: Capilla de la Caridad is a Roman Catholic chapel in Villa Nueva, Algeciras, Spain.

== History ==
The Chapel of the Charity was built in 1768 on the Plaza Juan de Lima, attached to the old Charity Hospital. It has a single nave and a facade with a main door flanked by Doric pilasters. A plaque on the door reminds people that it was built by public subscription. During the eighteenth century the chapel was dedicated to the Virgen del Carmen, patron saint of seafarers, due to the proximity of the port at the time. During the assaults of 1931 this chapel was ransacked and although many of the more valuable items were hidden, most of the images were destroyed.
