= Seagull Rock =

Island in Tasmania, Australia

Coordinates: 43°25′46″S 147°11′00″E

Seagull Rock is a small islet in south-eastern Australia. It is part of the Partridge Island Group, lying close to the south-eastern coast of Tasmania, in the D'Entrecasteaux Channel between Bruny Island and the mainland.

== Flora and fauna ==
The islet's vegetation is dominated by pigface and introduced grasses.
