= Hopetoun =

Hopetoun may refer to:

- Earl of Hopetoun, a courtesy title given to the heir of the Marquess of Linlithgow, head of the Scottish noble family of Hope
- Hopetoun House, an 18-century country house near Queensferry, West Lothian

Places named after the seventh Earl who was the first Governor-General of Australia:

- Hopetoun, Victoria, Australia
- Hopetoun, Western Australia
- Hopetoun Hotel, Sydney, Australia

== See also ==
- Hopeton (disambiguation)
- Hopetown (disambiguation)
