= Hope House (Garden City, Kansas) =

Historic house in Kansas, United States

- U.S. National Register of Historic Places
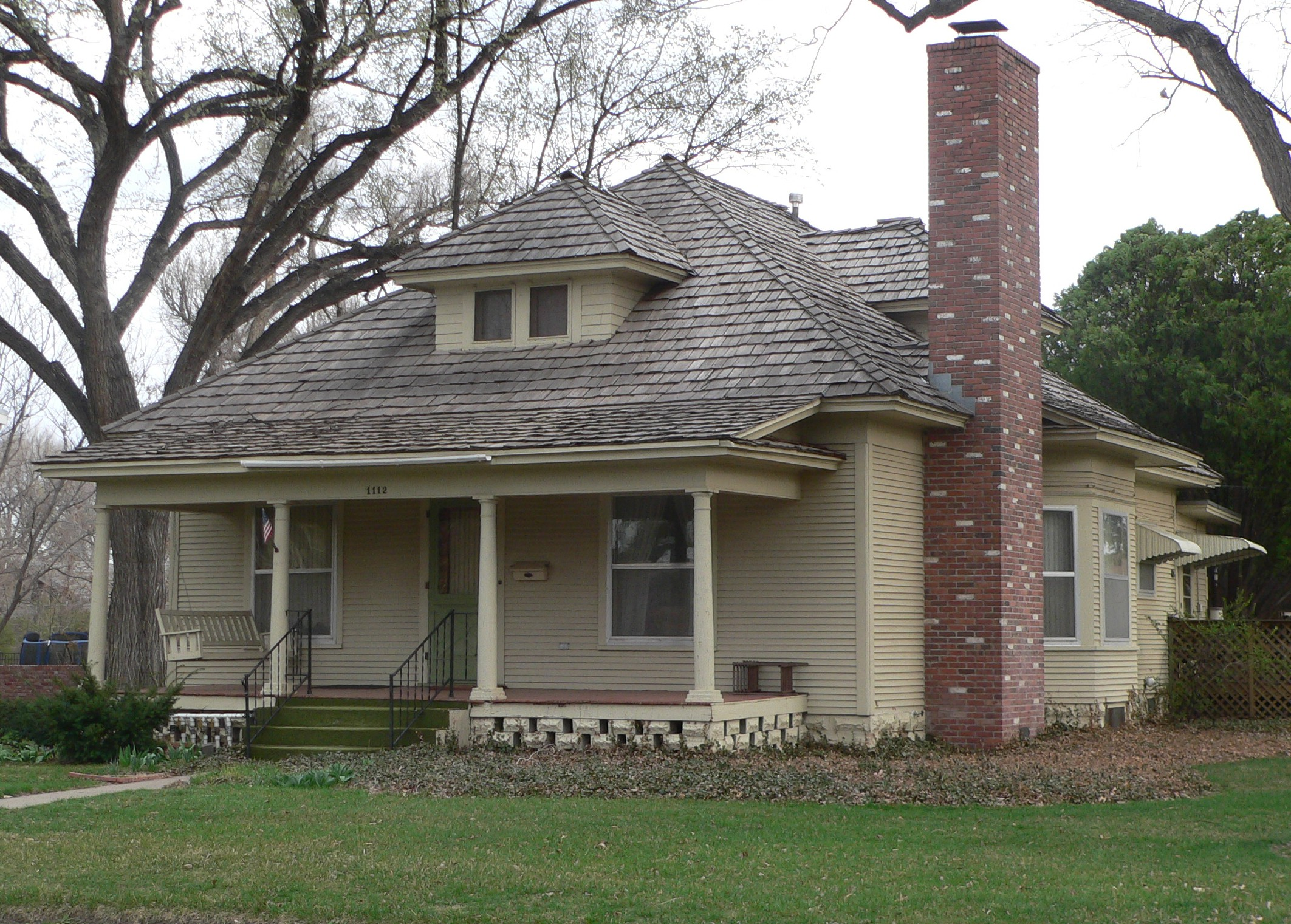

- Location within Kansas Location within the United States
- Location: 1112 Gillespie Place, Garden City, Kansas
- Coordinates: 37°58′13″N 100°51′36″W
- Area: less than one acre
- Built: 1908
- Built by: Krebs, Lew
- Architectural style: Bungalow/craftsman
- NRHP reference No.: 00000157
- Added to NRHP: March 3, 2000

The Hope House, at 1112 Gillespie Place in Garden City, Kansas, was built in 1908. It was listed on the National Register of Historic Places in 2000.

It is a one-and-a-half-story bungalow with narrow clapboard siding, on a cement stone block foundation, and faces north. It was built for F. E. McCombs, a cashier at a bank, by contractor Lew Krebs.
