= Charity Hospital =

Charity Hospital may refer to:

- Charity Hospital (New Orleans)
- Charity Hospital (Savannah, Georgia), listed on the National Register of Historic Places in Georgia
- City Hospital (Roosevelt Island, New York), formerly known as Charity Hospital
- Category:Charitable hospitals

== See also ==
- Hospital de la Caridad (disambiguation), the literal translation of Charity Hospital into Spanish
