= Hospital de la Caridad (Algeciras) =

Arts centre in Algeciras, Spain

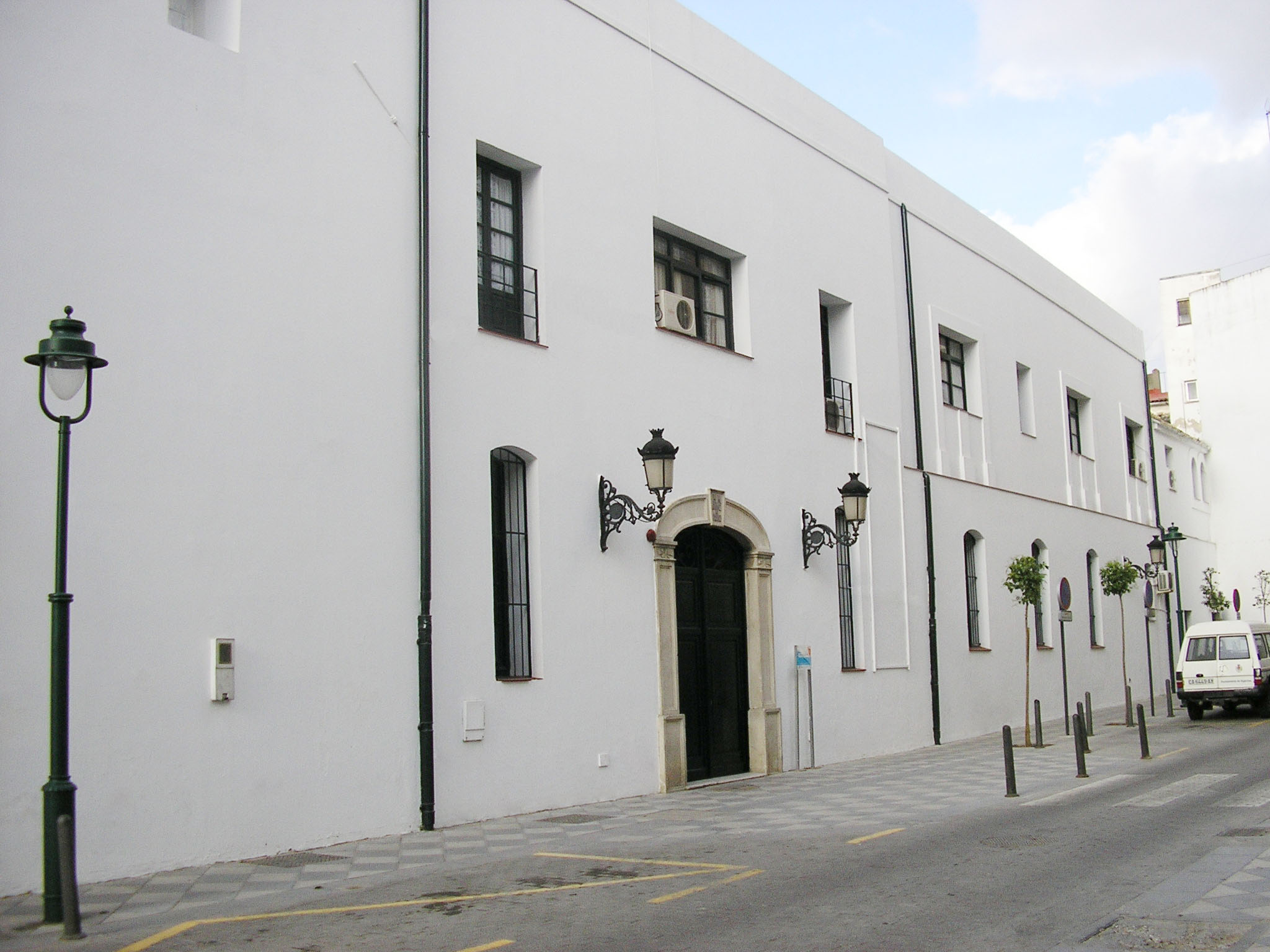
- Hospital de la Caridad

Geography
- Location: Algeciras, Spain
- Coordinates: 36°07′40.5″N 5°26′53.67″W

Organisation
- Type: General

History
- Opened: 1768
- Closed: 1990

Links
- Lists: Hospitals in Spain

The Hospital de la Caridad or Charity Hospital in Algeciras, Spain was built as a hospital to serve the population but today the building is preserved as part of the town's cultural heritage. It has been an arts centre but is intended to become a municipal museum.

== History ==
The hospital was built with the patronage of Father Tomás del Valle who in 1748 was the Bishop of Cádiz and Ceuta. The hospital was required because the existing military hospital could not handle the long staying cases. The cost was met by the diocese and by popular contributions. Within four years some rooms were complete and the adjoining chapel, Chapel of La Caridad was ready by 1754 but the hospital itself was not finished until 1768. The hospital had two storeys build around two courtyards with one on them serving as a graveyard.

The funding of the hospital changed over the years as the state took over from the uncertainty of charity funding. The final addition was an extra wing in 1928 but the hospital ceased to be a hospital during the twentieth century. It still had a maternity role in 1975.

In 1990 it was taken over by a cultural foundation called "José Luis Cano" who put their name to the building until the foundation struggled in 2012. The building is to become a municipal museum.
