= Hope Lodge =

Hope Lodge may refer to:

- Hope Lodge (American Cancer Society), a program of the American Cancer Society providing lodging to cancer patients receiving treatment far from home and their caregivers
- Hope Lodge No. 145, Lafayette, Louisiana, listed on the National Register of Historic Places (NRHP)
- Hope Lodge (Whitemarsh Township, Pennsylvania), NRHP-listed

== See also ==
- Hope House (disambiguation)
