= The Hope (sculpture) =

Sculpture by Nicky Imber

Coordinates: 32.9218°N 35.3019°E

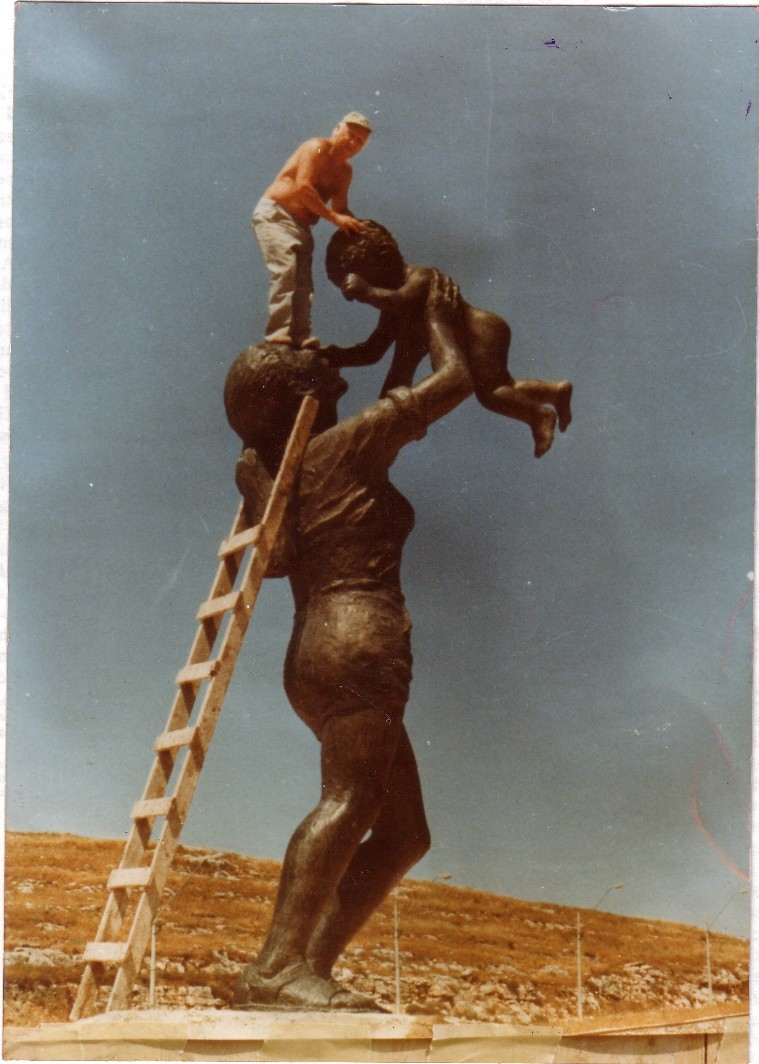
Nicky Imber building "Hope" in Carmiel, Israel

The Hope is a sculpture by Nicky Imber depicting a woman proudly raising her child to the sky symbolically heralding a new generation. It is named after the Israeli national anthem, "Hatikva" and is part of the Holocaust Memorial Park entitled "From Holocaust to Resurrection", located in Karmiel, Israel.

== Background and Aesthetics ==
Escaping the Nazi concentration camp in Dachau, Imber promised himself to dedicate his artistic life to perpetuating the memory of the Holocaust. In 1978 he started work on the Holocaust Memorial Park in Karmiel.

The Hope statue is the tallest sculpture in the third part of the series. The sculpture is made of bronze with a green patina, and took Imber's crew of six approximately five months work to go through the cement and wax stages before getting to the final bronze casting. As of 2013, the statue's approximate worth is 1.2 million US dollars. Imber's smaller signed versions of the sculpture, measuring about 38 cm, have been sold for approximately 26 thousand US dollars

== See also ==
- Israeli sculpture
