= Hope, U.S. Virgin Islands =

Coordinates: 17.71470°N 64.75792°W

Hope, United States Virgin Islands
- Village
- Interactive map of Hope, United States Virgin Islands
- Country: United States Virgin Islands
- Island: Saint Croix
- Time zone: UTC-4 (AST)

Hope is a settlement on the island of Saint Croix in the United States Virgin Islands.
