= Hope (1802 Peterhead ship) =

British whaler 1802–1830

History

United Kingdom
- Name: Hope
- Launched: 1802, Peterhead
- Fate: Lost 3 July 1830

General characteristics
- Tons burthen: 242, or 242 (bm)

Hope was launched at Peterhead in 1802. She was a whaler in the British northern whale fishery for her entire career. She was lost on 3 July 1830 in the Davis Strait. Her crew were rescued.

== Career ==
The Peterhead Greenland whale fishery began in 1788 with a voyage by a relatively small vessel, Robert, of 169 tons (bm). In 1798 Alexander Geary became master of Robert, and under his command her success improved markedly: she brought in four whales that yielded more than 70 tons of whale oil. However, she was a small vessel, and ill-suited to the business. In 1801, her owners sold her. The newly-built Hope, with Geary in command, replaced Robert. Hope was larger, at 240 tons (bm), and better equipped for Arctic work. In her first whaling season, Hope took 11 whales and brought home more than 117 tons of blubber.

At about this time, Geary, with others, formed Peterhead's first whaling company. They purchased a granary at Keith Inch and converted it into a boil house and stores.

The data below is from the Scottish Arctic Whaling Database.

Year	Master	Where	Whales	Tuns whale oil
1802	A.Geary	East Greenland	Full	
1803	A.Geary	East Greenland	8	
1804	A.Geary	East Greenland	20	
1805	A.Geary	East Greenland	20	
1806	A.Geary	East Greenland	6	
1807	A.Geary	East Greenland	9	
1808	A.Geary	East Greenland	27	
1809	A.Geary	East Greenland	26	
1810	G.Sangster	East Greenland	17	
1811	G.Sangster	East Greenland	27	
1812	A.Geary	East Greenland	21	
1813	A.Geary	East Greenland	8	
1814	T.Phillips	East Greenland	14	157

Eighteen-fourteen was the most successful year for Peterhead whalers. The seven Peterhead whalers killed a total of 163 whales to bring in a total of 192 tuns of whale oil; this gives an average of 198½ tuns per whale. Hope was the least successful of the seven whalers.

Year	Master	Where	Whales	Tuns whale oil
1815	T.Phillips	East Greenland	5	85
1816	W.Robertson	East Greenland	10	61
1817	W.Robertson	East Greenland	9	103
1818	W.Robertson	East Greenland	3	36
1819	A.Mackie	East Greenland	6 + 47 seals	26
1820	A.Mackie	East Greenland	2 + 45 seals	9

In 1821 she was registered at Aberdeen with Mackie, master, and John Hutchinson, owner.

Year	Master	Where	Whales	Tuns whale oil
1821	W.Robertson	East Greenland	10	113
1822	W.Robertson	East Greenland	4	73
1823	J.Gilchrist	East Greenland	13	192
1824	J.Birnie	East Greenland	7	101
1825	J.Volum	Davis Strait	6	72
1826	J.Volum	Davis Strait	1	17
1827	J.Volum	East Greenland	7	56
1828	J.Volum	Davis Strait	7	112
1829	J.Volum	Davis Strait	8	120
1830	J.Volum	Davis Strait	0	0

== Fate ==
Hope was lost on 3 July 1830. She was one of the many whalers lost in 1830. She was Peterhead's longest-serving whaler.

Eighteen-thirty was the worst year for ship losses in the Arctic since 1819, when whalers first crossed the straits. Eighteen whalers (or 19), out of 91 vessels were lost, for a total tonnage of 5,614 tons (bm). The second highest loss had occurred in 1823 when 13 vessels totaling 4,409 tons (bm), were lost.
