= Hopeton, Virginia =

Unincorporated community in Virginia, United States

Coordinates: 37°48′26″N 75°38′15″W

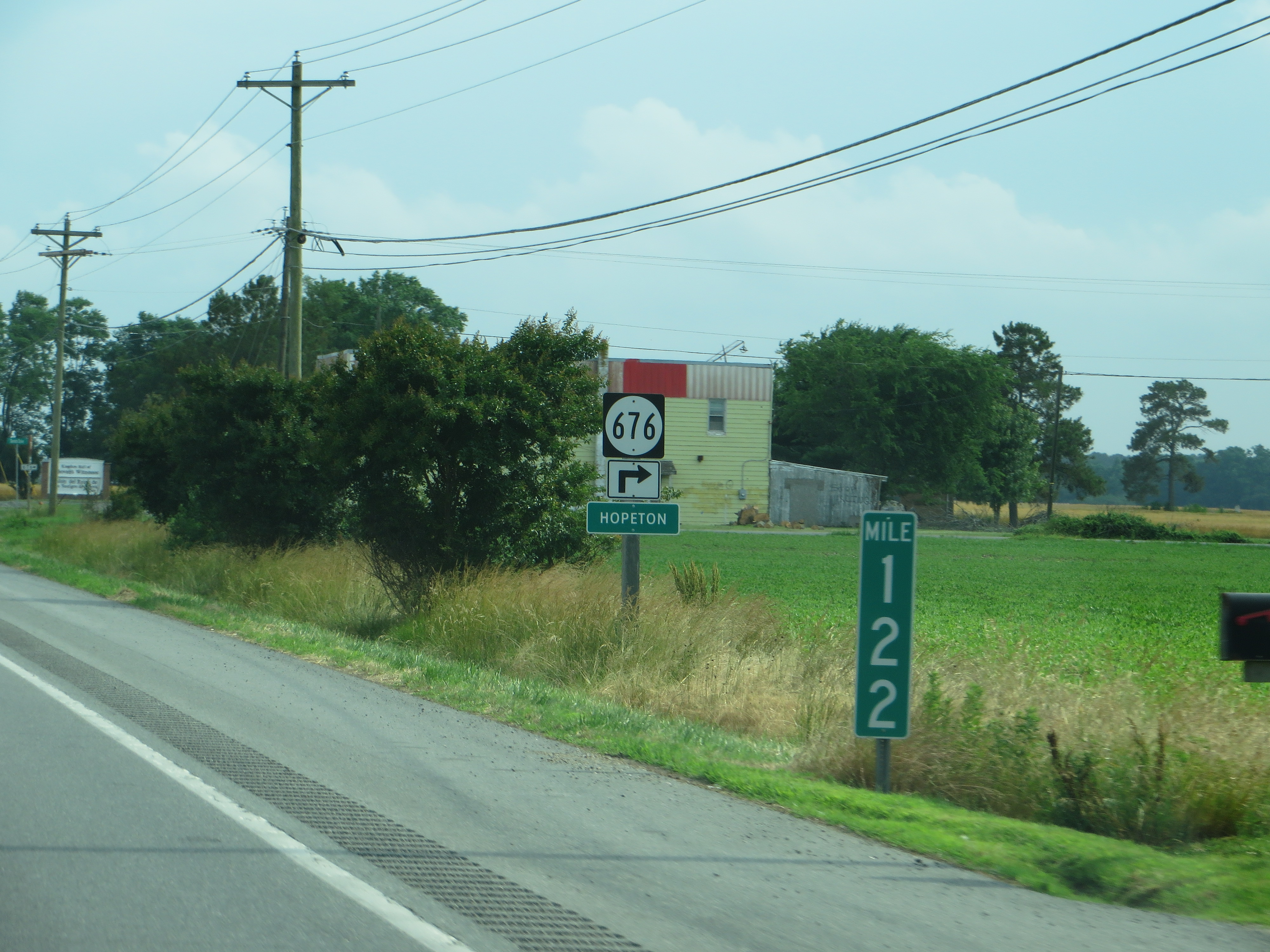
Along U.S. Route 13 at Hopeton

Hopeton is an unincorporated community in Accomack County, Virginia, United States.
