= Hope River (West Coast) =

River in West Coast Region, New Zealand

Coordinates: 44°5′50″S 168°20′11″E

The Hope River is a river in the southern part of the West Coast region of New Zealand, being the southernmost of three rivers named Hope in the South Island. It flows west for 15 kilometres, reaching the Tasman Sea 25 kilometres north of Big Bay.
