= Hope Valley =

Hope Valley may refer to:

== Australia ==
- Hope Valley, Western Australia, a suburb of Perth
- Hope Valley, South Australia, a suburb of Adelaide

== England ==
- Hope Valley, Derbyshire
- Hope Valley, Shropshire, cared for by the Shropshire Wildlife Trust

== North America ==
- Hope Valley, Alberta, a locality in the Canadian province of Alberta
- Hope Valley, Rhode Island, a village in the town of Hopkinton, in the US
- Hope Valley, Durham, North Carolina, a country club community, in the US
- Hope Valley (California), a subalpine valley in the Sierra Nevada mountains of California

== See also ==
- Hope Vale, Queensland
