= Hope (sloop) =

Sailboat completed in 1948

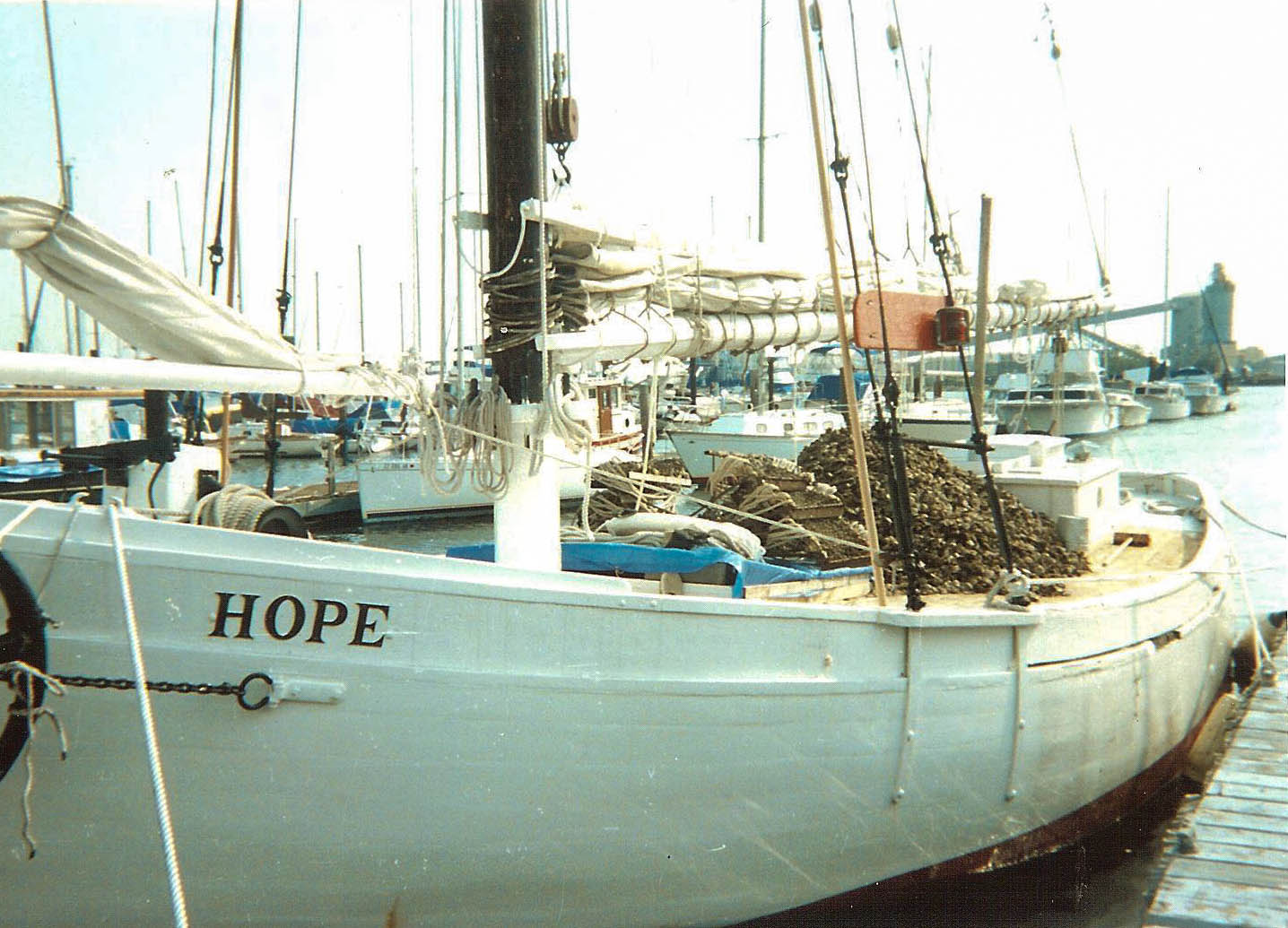
- Oyster sloop Hope loaded with oysters in summer 1991

History

United States
- Name: Hope
- Builder: Stanley G. Chard
- Laid down: 1945
- Launched: 1948
- Home port: Norwalk, Connecticut

General characteristics
- Type: Sloop
- Length: 56 ft (17 m) LOA; 42 ft 2 in (12.9 m) LWL
- Beam: 15 ft 2 in (4.6 m)
- Height: 48 ft (15 m) Mainmast
- Draft: 4 ft 9 in (1.4 m)
- Sail plan: Gaff rig

Hope is an oyster sloop that was completed in 1948. It is believed to be the last sail-powered oystering vessel built on the Long Island Sound. Hope is 56 feet (17 m) long, including the bowsprit, and 42 feet 2 inches (12.9 m) at the waterline. Its beam is 15 feet 2 inches (4.6 m), and it draws 4 feet 9 inches (1.4 m) with the centerboard up. Hope is gaff rigged, 'V'-bottomed and has an 850-pound (390 kg) centerboard. Hope's shallow draft facilitated shoal water work.

== Construction ==
The keel of Hope was hewn from a giant white oak felled in a hurricane on Brush Island in Indian Harbor, Greenwich, Connecticut.

The frame and planking are of white oak trees cut on the Benedict estate across the harbor from Brush Island. They were hauled to Buttery Sawmill in Silvermine to be cut into lumber. The hull is all white oak, double planked and put together by trunnels. The deck is Douglas fir, 2 inches (5 cm) thick.

Hope's mast is a 48 feet (15 m) Navy Sitka spruce spar from the Brooklyn Navy Yard. Sitka spruce, although it is not considered a lightweight wood, is enormously strong for its weight. Hope’s mast is stepped slightly off-center, a bit to port.

Although engines were becoming commonplace for work vessels in the 1940s, Hope, like its predecessors, was designed as a sail-powered vessel because of shell fishing laws enacted before World War 1, which lasted until 1969. These laws, designed to protect state-owned oyster grounds, prohibited the use of motor-powered vessels on the grounds.

Designed by Stanley G. Chard, Hope was built on Brush Island by Chard and his two nephews, William B. Chard and Clarence E. Chard.

Work on Hope was begun in the fall of 1945 and continued for three winters and one summer. The vessel was launched early in the summer of 1948.

== Life and service ==
=== 1940s–1970s ===
The Chards used the Hope, so christened because of the failing oyster harvests, to dredge for oysters for more than 10 years until the oyster beds were decimated by starfish. Then, Clarence Chard used Hope to dredge for clams until his retirement several years later.

After his retirement, Clarence Chard converted Hope to an excursion boat, which he kept tied up near the Showboat Restaurant in Greenwich, CT, spending much of his time aboard, until 1971, when he sold it to Jack Spratt of Old Greenwich, who used it for family sailing.

During the time that Jack Spratt owned the vessel; it featured 1,495 square feet (139 m^{2}) of sail and a six-cylinder Hercules truck engine, which was later replaced by a 135 horsepower (101 kW) Palmer auxiliary engine. Under Spratt's ownership, the old sailcloth sails, too heavy for pleasure boating, were replaced with lighter Dacron sails. Other changes made by Spratt were the installation of a taffrail and brass stanchions with a stainless steel lifeline. A lifeline is a line on the deck of a boat, to which one can attach oneself to stay aboard in rough seas. A boom gallows was added at the stern with davits for a dinghy.

Under Spratt's ownership, Hope sailed in many parades and festivals. It participated in Operation Sail in New York Harbor during the United States Bicentennial celebration in 1976. In 1978 it participated in the Boston Harbor Festival as well as the Norwalk Seaport Oyster Festival. Hope also represented the Town of Greenwich at various celebrations and regattas over the years.

=== 1980s ===
In October 1981, The Norwalk Seaport Association purchased Hope from Spratt for $15,000, which would be paid off over the next three years. Hope became the flagship of the Norwalk Seaport Association. On May 22, 1982, Hope was commissioned at the Veterans Memorial Park launching ramps in Norwalk, CT in a ceremony that included music, poetry, and speeches from then Mayor Thomas C. O'Connor and the President of the Norwalk Seaport Association.

In the following years, the Norwalk Seaport Association raised funds to restore and maintain Hope. In November 1983, they commissioned nationally renowned marine artist, Mark Greene to produce a lithograph of the vessel. Fifty of the pieces were created, each one being signed and custom framed. As part of the Seaport Association’s Hope Chest initiative, the first 35 people to donate $1,000 or more to the vessel would receive one of the images, with the remaining 15 to be sold in coming years.

During the time that Hope was owned by the Norwalk Seaport Association, it was re-painted, its steering box and engine were rebuilt and some planks were replaced. Additionally, a dedicated dock for Hope was constructed in the Norwalk River off of North Water Street in South Norwalk, where it resided beginning in May 1983.

As the efforts of the Seaport Association turned more toward the refurbishing of Sheffield Island Light, which they acquired in 1987, Hope was donated to the Maritime Aquarium at Norwalk, which was then known as The Maritime Center.

For the years following, Hope sat on display in the court yard of The Maritime Aquarium until, in 1990, Tallmadge Brothers, an oyster company in Norwalk, took on the project of restoring Hope.

=== 1990s–present ===
In a local news article, Hillard Bloom of Tallmadge Brothers explained that the vessel should not have been hauled and left on dry land as it had, if there were intentions of ever making it a working vessel again. He stated that the planks of oak vessels like Hope have the tendency to shrink when removed from the water for an extended period of time. The restoration process began with Hope being lifted back into the water where its boards were given the opportunity to take in moisture and expand.

The restoration process continued when the crew of Tallmadge Brothers transported the vessel to a dry dock in Bridgeport, CT where its boards were caulked, its deck was sanded, its mast was stepped, its bottom and topsides were painted, and it was fully rigged.

After its restoration, Hope was given to the Norwalk Maritime Aquarium and remained on display at the Hope Dock in the Norwalk River located between the South Norwalk Railroad Bridge and the Stroffolino draw bridge. On land, facing the boat below is a kiosk explaining Hope’s history, which those passing on the sidewalk can read.

Hope has recently fallen victim to corrosion and wood rot as the Maritime Aquarium had difficulties keeping the maintenance budget current. Hope has been acquired by Shenton and Kelcey King of Bridgeport, CT. Shenton intends to restore the vessel for use as a private pleasure vessel for himself and his family. Shenton's father and past president of the Norwalk Seaport Association, Richard S. King, led the original acquisition and restoration team when the vessel was first acquired by the Seaport Association in the early 1980s.
