= Hope! – Das Obama Musical =

German musical

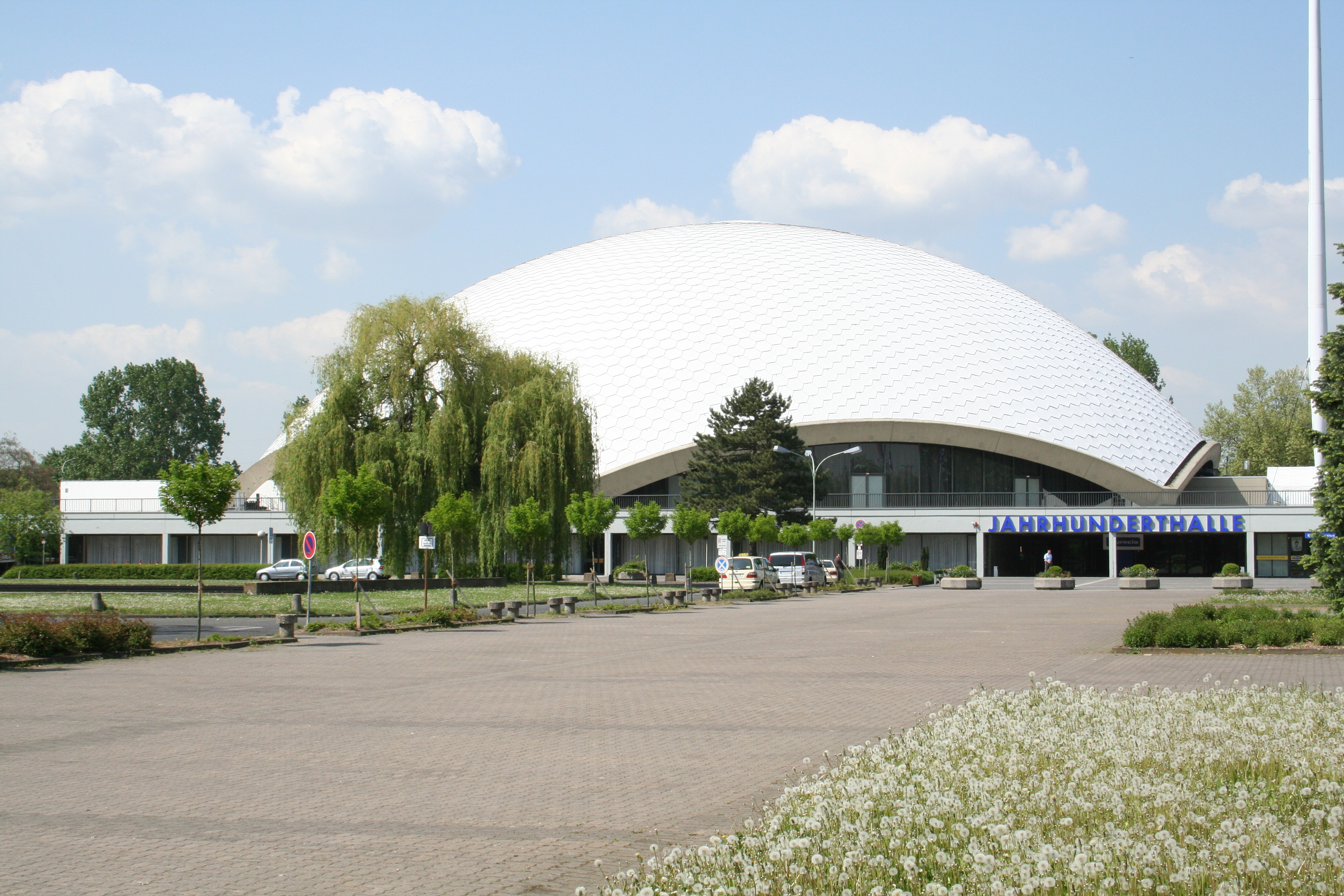
Jahrhunderthalle, a venue in Frankfurt, Germany, where Hope! – Das Obama Musical premiered

Hope! – Das Obama Musical (English: Hope! - The Obama Musical) is a German musical inspired by the personal life and career of U.S. President Barack Obama, from his time in Chicago, Illinois, until the 2008 U.S. presidential election. The show premiered on January 17, 2010, at Frankfurt's Jahrhunderthalle, a 2,000-seat venue. It is believed to be the first stage production portraying the life of a U.S. president while he is still serving in office.
