= Hope (1804 ship) =

History

United Kingdom
- Name: Hope
- Owner: Cook & Co.
- Builder: Hudson, Calcutta
- Launched: 8 March 1804
- Fate: Captured in 1808.

France
- Name: Hope
- Acquired: June 1808 by capture
- Captured: December 1810

United Kingdom
- Name: Hope
- Acquired: December 1810 by capture
- Renamed: Madras Merchant
- Fate: Sold 1816

General characteristics
- Tons burthen: 301, or 30164/94, or 302 (bm)
- Propulsion: Sail
- Armament: 2 ×6-pounder guns + 8 × 12-pounder carronades

Hope was launched in 1804 at Calcutta. She made one voyage for the British East India Company (EIC). She continued to trade around India until a French frigate captured her in 1808. She apparently returned to English hands and was renamed Madras Merchant. She was then sold in 1816 at Manila.

== Career ==
Hope, Captain J. Cook, sailed from Bengal on 22 August 1805. She was serving as a packet for the EIC. She reached Saint Helena on 12 November and arrived at the Downs on 2 January 1806.

Hope was admitted to the Registry of Great Britain on 15 March 1806. She appears in the Register of Shipping with J. Cook, master and owner, and trade London–India. Similarly, the Register of Shipping for 1809 shows Hope with J. Cook, master and owner, and trade London–India.

== Fate ==
A letter from Madras dated 17 December 1808 reported that a French frigate, possibly Caroline, captured the brig Jane, Bennet, master, off Pedang, and Hope, Cook, sailing to Bengal. By another report, capitaine de frègate Jean Dornal de Guy, in Manche, captured her in June 1808 at Bencoolen, and sent her to Mauritius.

According to one report Hope returned to British hands and was renamed Madras Merchant. She was sold at Manila in 1816. It is possible that Hope was the French ship "Le Hope, of 400 Tons", that was among the many vessels that the British captured on 3 December 1810 when they captured Mauritius.

A Madras Merchant visited Java several times in 1814 with masters F. Strant and Charles Eaton.
