= Hope (Silent Border album) =

Studio album by Silent Border
- Released: July 2007
- Recorded: January–March 2007 at Anders LJudbild-studio in Säffle, Sweden
- Genre: Rock, hard rock, art rock, alternative rock
- Length: 41:54
- Label: None
- Producer: Silent Border, Anders Bergström

Professional ratings
Review scores
Source	Rating
Artrock.se	(7.5/10) Swedish
NWT	(3/5) Swedish

Hope is a 2007 studio album by Swedish rockband Silent Border, it was recorded during the winter/spring of 2007 but was not released until the summer. It is the first recording project ever undertaken by Silent Border and was completely self-financed.

Although originally written as a Pink Floyd-style concept album the storyline was partially abandoned during rewrites but fragments of an overarching storyline can still be heard on the album. It garnered mostly positive reviews when it was released.

== Track listing ==
All songs by Silent Border

1. "Searching for beaches"
2. "In the day"
3. "Island in a field"
4. "Stressed out"
5. "The dream of grass"
6. "Your decision"
7. "Riptide"
8. "Washed ashore"
9. "Settled by fear"
10. "Hope"
