= No Hope, No Fear =

Studio album by Borghesia
- Released: 1987
- Recorded: Studio CD, Studio Tivoli
- Genre: Electronic Music
- Length: 28:15
- Label: Play It Again Sam Records

Borghesia chronology
Their Laws, Our Lives (1986)	No Hope, No Fear (1987)	Escorts and Models (1988)

No Hope, No Fear is the third album by Borghesia, released in 1987 on Play It Again Sam Records. Album No Hope, No Fear inspired the title of a radio show dedicated to the music from Yugoslavia on Canadian radio station CFMU.

== Track listing ==
1. "Ni Upanja, Ni Strahu - No Hope, No Fear" – 4:30
2. "Na Smrtno Kazen - Sentenced To Death" – 5:15
3. "133" – 4:15
4. "Blato - Mud" – 5:16
5. "Lovci - Hunters" – 3:19
6. "Mi smo Povsod - We Are Everywhere" – 5:41
