= Charity Lake =

- Location within Vancouver Island
- Location: Vancouver Island, British Columbia
- Coordinates: 49°40′00″N 125°26′00″W
- Lake type: Natural lake
- Basin countries: Canada

Charity Lake is a lake located on Vancouver Island is an expansion of Ralph River south of Mount Albert Edward in Strathcona Provincial Park,

== See also ==
- List of lakes of British Columbia
