= Hope Island (Tasmania) =

Island in Tasmania, Australia

Coordinates: 43°20′S 147°02′E

The Hope Island, part of the Partridge Island Group, is a small island that lies close to the south-eastern coast of Tasmania, Australia. The island is located in the D'Entrecasteaux Channel between Bruny Island and the Tasmanian mainland. Its neighbouring islets are named Faith and Charity, and also the Arch Rock.

== Flora and fauna ==
The island was previously farmed, and is mostly cleared of its original vegetation, though small patches of eucalypts remain. Rabbits are present.

== History ==
"HOPE ISLAND.-This is the island to which D'Entrecasteaux gave the name of Lahaye, in honour of a famous French gardener. It was discovered on 20 May 1792, by M. de la Janice, an officer of the ship Esperance."

== See also ==
- List of islands of Tasmania
