= Hope Historic District =

Hope Historic District may refer to:

- Hope Historic District (Hope, Alaska), listed on the National Register of Historic Places in Kenai Peninsula Borough, Alaska
- Hope Historic District (Hope, Indiana), listed on the National Register of Historic Places in Bartholomew County, Indiana
- Hope Historic District (Hope, New Jersey), listed on the NRHP in Warren County, New Jersey
- Hope Village Historic District, listed on the NRHP in Providence County, Rhode Island
