= HMS Rattler (1797) =

Gunvessel of the Royal Navy

History

Great Britain
- Name: Hope
- Launched: Leith, or Dysart, Fife
- Fate: Sold March 1797

Great Britain
- Name: GB No.41
- Renamed: HMS Rattler
- Fate: Sold 1802

United Kingdom
- Name: Hope
- Fate: Last listed in 1816

General characteristics
- Tons burthen: 155, or 156, or 158 (bm)
- Length: Overall: 72 ft 7 in (22.1 m); Keel: 59 ft 3 in (18.1 m)
- Beam: 22 ft 4 in (6.8 m)
- Depth of hold: 9 ft 4 3/4 in (2.9 m)
- Complement: 50
- Armament: 1797:2 × 18-pounder guns + 10 × 18-pounder carronades; 1810: 4 × 6-pounder carronades; 1812: 2 × 3-pounder guns

HMS Rattler was the mercantile Hope that the Royal Navy purchased at Leith in 1797. It initially named her GB No.41, and then renamed her HMS Rattler. The Navy sold her in 1802. She returned to the name Hope and became a merchantman trading with Hamburg, Gibraltar, and lastly, Cowes. She was last listed in 1816.

== Career ==
The Royal Navy commissioned Rattler in September 1797 under Lieutenant John Gibbs. He died, probably before but possibly after Lieutenant Samuel Wickham took command of Rattler in June 1798, for the North Sea. On 18 July 1801 she arrived at Elsinor, having escorted the Leith fleet. The Navy sold Rattler on 31 May 1802, shortly after the Peace of Amiens took effect.

Rattler returned to her original name, Hope, and first appeared in Lloyd's Register (LR) in 1802.

Year	Master	Owner	Trade	Source & notes
1802	M.Tate	Captain & Co.	London–Hamburg	LR; raised 1802
1804	M.Tate	W.Witham	Liverpool–London; London–Toning	LR; raised 1802
1807	P.Tate	Captain & Co.	London–Hamburg	LR; raised 1802
1809	P.Tate; W.Gibson	Walton	London–Hamburg	Register of Shipping
1810	W.Gibson; M.Lewish	Walton; Vickerman	London–Gibraltar	Register of Shipping
1811	M.Lewish; Vickerman	Vickerman; Lavers	Plymouth; London–Gibraltar	LR; raised 1802
1812	M.Lourish	N.Lavers	Cowes–London	LR; raised 1802

== Fate ==
Hope was last listed in Lloyd's Register in 1816 with data unchanged since 1812.
