= Hope High School (Afghanistan) =

School in Kabul, Afghanistan

Information
- Established: 2000; 25 years ago

Hope High School is an educational institution that was established in 2000 in Kabul, Afghanistan.
