= Hopeful =

Hopeful may refer to

- "Hopeful" (Ami Suzuki song)
- "Hopeful" (Bars and Melody song)
- Hopeful, Alabama
- Hopeful, Georgia
- Mount Hopeful, peak in the Shetland Islands

== See also ==
- Hope
- The Hopefuls
