= Hope House (Memphis, Tennessee) =

Hope House Day Care
- Founded: 1994
- Founder: Junior League of Memphis, Tennessee
- Location: 23 Idlewild St., S. Memphis, TN 38104

Hope House is a nonprofit organization for children infected or affected by HIV/AIDS and their families in Memphis, Tennessee, USA. It was founded in 1994 by the Junior League of Memphis and opened in 1995. Its mission is "to improve the quality of life of HIV-impacted children and their families by addressing their educational, social, psychological and health needs".

Founded as a respite care facility for women with HIV/AIDS, it gradually transformed into a daycare center for their children and finally into an education center and social services organization. It is the only daycare center in Tennessee specifically for HIV-affected families and one of only a few in the United States. The majority of students are from low-income African-American families.

Most of Hope House's operating budget is received through monetary donations, city, state, and federal grants, and grants from national and international organizations. In-kind donations of supplies are also received.

Hope House offers education (including a GED program) for parents, counseling with social workers, and a housing program, as well as other resources for HIV-positive women.
