= HOPE for New Hampshire Recovery =

Substance abuse recovery organization in New Hampshire

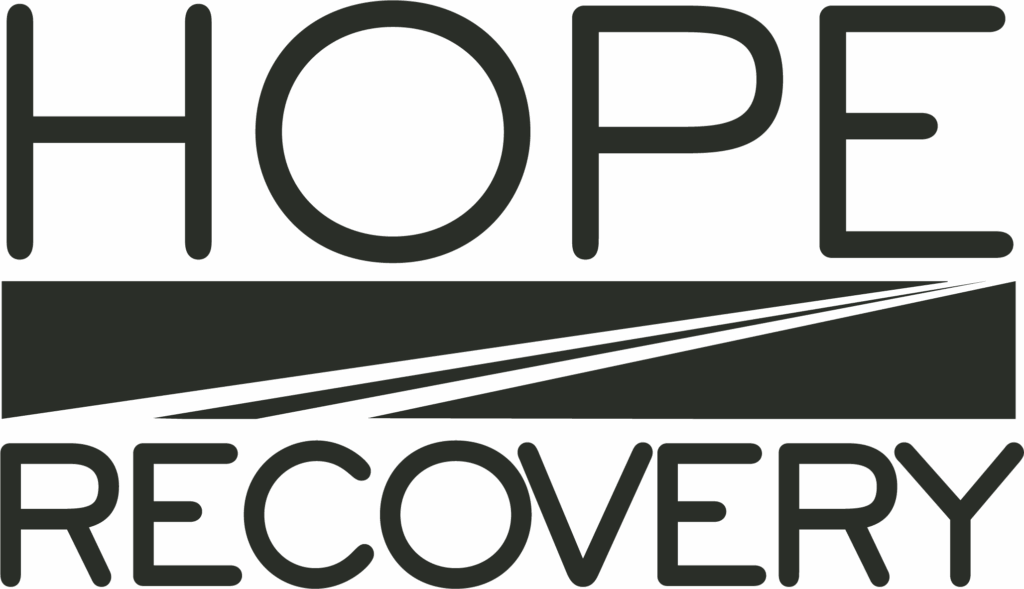
- Logo of HOPE for New Hampshire Recovery
- Executive director: Randy Stevens
- Website: recoverynh.org

HOPE for New Hampshire Recovery, also known as HOPE for NH Recovery, is a non-profit substance abuse recovery organization in New Hampshire, United States. HOPE for New Hampshire does not provide clinical treatment for addiction, instead opting to help addicts with support groups and other social activities. HOPE for New Hampshire Recovery was New Hampshire's first addiction recovery center.

== Location ==
HOPE for New Hampshire Recovery's main building is in Manchester, New Hampshire, alongside other centers located around New Hampshire.

== History ==
HOPE for New Hampshire Recovery was founded in 2014 as a revival of a similar organization from the 1990s.

On October 18, 2014, Hope for New Hampshire Recovery held a "We Believe in Recovery" rally sponsored by the New Hampshire Charitable Trust at the New Hampshire State House in Concord with guest speakers to celebrate addiction recovery. Another similar "We Believe in Recovery" event was held the following year on September 26 at White Park, Concord with guest speakers.

In December 2015, politician Dan Innis voiced his support for HOPE for New Hampshire Recovery in the Concord Monitor.

On May 2, 2016, HOPE for New Hampshire Recovery aimed to open Concord's first recovery center, with permission being granted from the city's zoning board three days later. Next month in June, the bill Carl's Law was announced by Annie Kuster at the new Concord center. In July, HOPE for New Hampshire Recovery opened a center in Claremont, New Hampshire.

In August, HOPE for New Hampshire Recovery faced criticism after a political ad by the National Republican Senatorial Committee accusing Maggie Hassan of mismanaging New Hampshire's opioid crisis featured one of their board members. In response, the board member featured in the ad resigned. In December, HOPE for New Hampshire Recovery opened a new center in Franklin, New Hampshire.

In June 2017, several employees quit, alleging that "staffers used and at times sold drugs at work" and that they were verbally abused. This caused HOPE for New Hampshire Recovery to be briefly investigated by New Hampshire Attorney General Gordon MacDonald, indefinitely blocking state funding, but he did not find anything illegal. After the investigation, state funding was not restored. In February 2018, HOPE for New Hampshire Recovery announced it would be closing four of its centers due to the lack of state funding. The centre in Claremont delayed closure due to additional funding supplied by locals, but still closed soon after. On March 7 2018, the Executive Council of New Hampshire announced it would "consider a new contract that will give the organization the resources required to prevent these closures", unanimously approving a $600,000 state contract the next day. Despite this, their Concord centre still closed.

In August 2021, HOPE for New Hampshire Recovery filed a lawsuit against Facebook, accusing them of violating the New Hampshire's Consumer Protection and Unfair Business Practices law.

In 2025, the Manchester Fire Department gifted the organization an SUV after the organization said they were "in need of more transportation".
