= USS Hope =

USS Hope may refer to the following ships of the United States Navy:

- USS Hope (1861), was a Civil War gunboat purchased by the US Navy in November 1861 and sold 25 October 1865
- USS Hope (AH-7), was a hospital ship commissioned 15 August 1944

== See also ==
- Bob Hope-class vehicle cargo ship
