= HMS Hope =

Sixteen ships of the Royal Navy have borne the name HMS Hope:

- English ship Hope (1559) was a 48-gun galleon launched in 1559. She was rebuilt with 38-guns and renamed Assurance in 1604 and was broken up in 1645.
- English ship Hope (1626) was a ship, formerly the French privateer Esperance. She was captured in 1626 and released in 1630.
- English ship Hope (1652) was a 26-gun storeship purchased in 1652 and sold in 1657.
- HMS Hope (1665) was a 44-gun ship, formerly the Dutch Hoop. She was captured in 1665 and wrecked in 1666.
- HMS Hope (1666) was a hoy storeship captured from the Dutch in 1666 and recaptured by them in 1672.
- HMS Hope (1672) was a 2-gun fireship captured from the Dutch in 1672 and sold in 1674.
- HMS Hope (1678) was a 70-gun third rate launched in 1678 and captured by the French in 1695.
- HMS Hope (1764) was a 6-gun schooner purchased in 1764 and sold in 1778.
- HMS Hope (1775) was the American mercantile brig Sea Nymphe that HMS Mercury captured on 20 September 1775. The Royal Navy purchased her and renamed her Hope. The American privateer General Pickering captured her on 21 September 1779 and she became the American privateer Duke of Leinster. HMS Assurance recaptured her on 23 May 1781 and the Royal Navy took her back into service as HMS Recovery. The Royal Navy sold her at New York on 14 June 1783.
- HMS Hope (1780 cutter) was a 12-gun cutter, formerly the American Lady Washington. She was purchased in 1780, briefly captured by the French in 1781 but soon retaken, and was sold in 1785.
- HMS Hope (1780 brig-sloop) was a 14-gun brig-sloop purchased in 1780 and wrecked in 1781.
- HMS Hope (1794) was a 3-gun gunvessel, formerly a hoy. She was purchased in 1794 and listed until 1798.
- HMS Hope (1795) was a 14-gun sloop, formerly the Dutch Star. She was captured in 1795 and sold in 1807.
- HMS Hope (1808) was a 10-gun Cherokee-class brig-sloop launched in 1808 and sold in 1819. Between 1822 and 1839 she made six voyages as a whaler in the British Southern Whale Fishery.
- HMS Hope (1813) was a 10-gun tender launched in 1813. She was converted into a tank vessel and renamed YC42 in 1863 and was in service until 1880.
- HMS Hope (1824) was a 3-gun packet brig, adapted from the Cherokee-class design and launched in 1824. She was used for harbour service from 1854 and was broken up in 1882.
- HMS Hope (1910) was an Acorn-class destroyer launched in 1910 and sold in 1920.

== See also ==
- HMS Hopewell
- HMS Hope Prize
- HMS Good Hope
