= Charity Island (Tasmania) =

Island in Tasmania, Australia

Coordinates: 43°19′26.09″S 147°01′54.98″E

Charity Island is an islet with an area of 0.6 ha in south-eastern Australia. It is part of the Partridge Island Group, lying close to the south-eastern coast of Tasmania, in the D'Entrecasteaux Channel between Bruny Island and the mainland. Its neighbouring islets are named "Faith" and "Hope".

== Fauna ==
Recorded breeding seabird species are Pacific gull and kelp gull.

== See also ==
- List of islands of Tasmania
