= Hopeton, California =

Unincorporated community in California, United States

Hopeton
- Unincorporated community
- Location in California Hopeton (the United States)
- Coordinates: 37°29′30″N 120°31′52″W
- Country: United States
- State: California
- County: Merced
- Elevation: 184 ft (56 m)

Hopeton (formerly Forlorn Hope and later Hopetown) is an unincorporated community in Merced County, California, United States. It is located 10.5 miles (17 km) north-northeast of Atwater, at an elevation of 184 feet (56 m).

Hopeton is located in the Merced River bottom, west of Snelling. A church was present at the townsite as early as 1852, and by 1881 the town had a population of over 1000. The Hopeton School District survived until 1973.

The first name of the place was Forlorn Hope, after a battle term. The Forlorn post office operated from 1854 to 1859, and from 1860 to 1861. The Hopeton post office operated from 1866 to 1894 and from 1911 to 1914.
