= Hope Township =

Hope Township may refer to:

== Canada ==
- Hope Township, Ontario, now Port Hope

== United States ==
Illinois

- Hope Township, LaSalle County, Illinois

Kansas

- Hope Township, Dickinson County, Kansas

Michigan

- Hope Township, Barry County, Michigan
- Hope Township, Midland County, Michigan

Minnesota

- Hope Township, Lincoln County, Minnesota

New Jersey

- Hope Township, New Jersey

North Dakota

- Hope Township, Cavalier County, North Dakota, in Cavalier County, North Dakota
- Hope Township, Ramsey County, North Dakota, in Ramsey County, North Dakota
