= Cardinal of Portugal's Altarpiece =

Painting by Antonio and Piero del Pollaiuolo

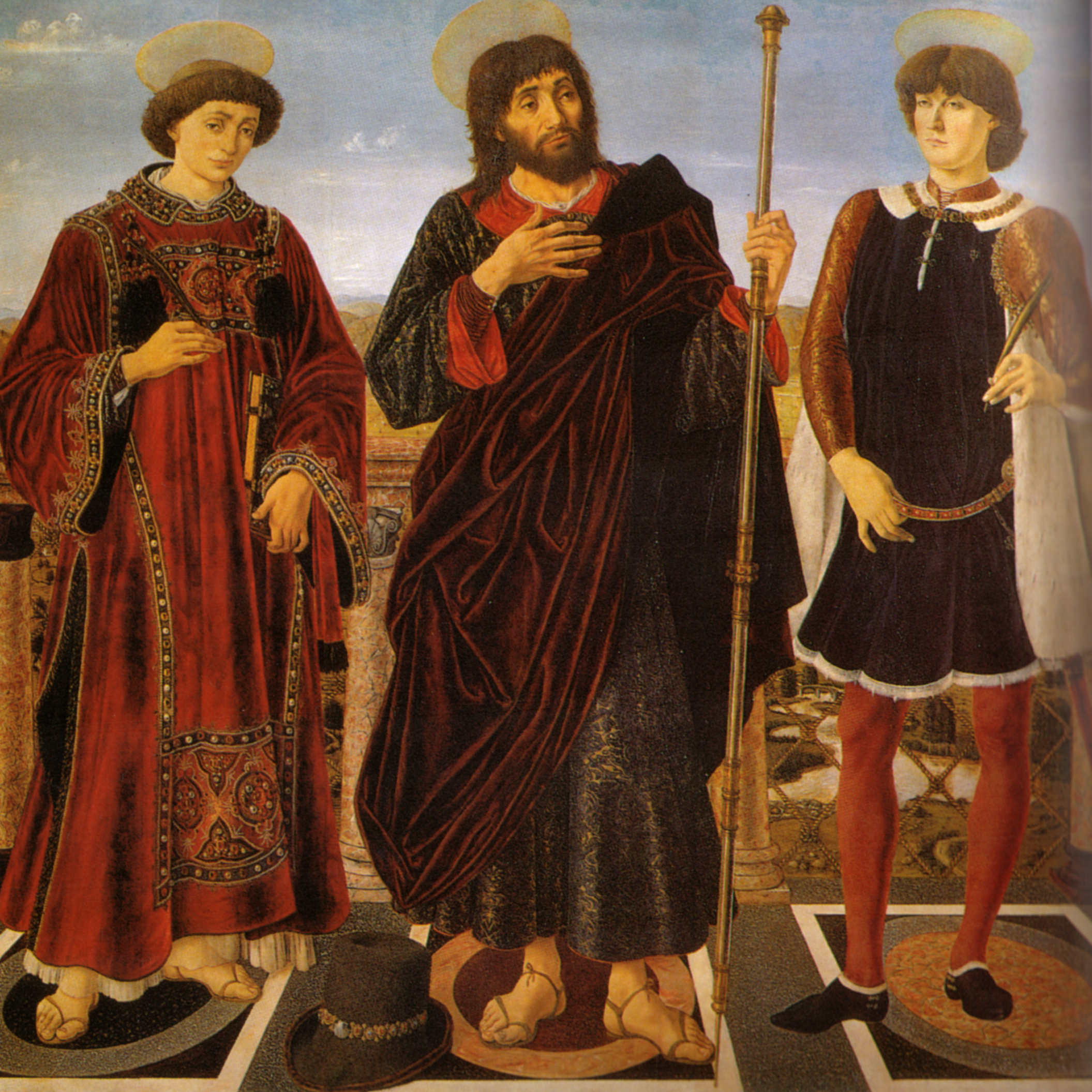
- Artist: Antonio and Piero del Pollaiuolo
- Year: c. 1466
- Medium: Tempera and oil on oak panel
- Dimensions: 172 cm × 179 cm (68 in × 70 in)
- Location: Uffizi, Florence

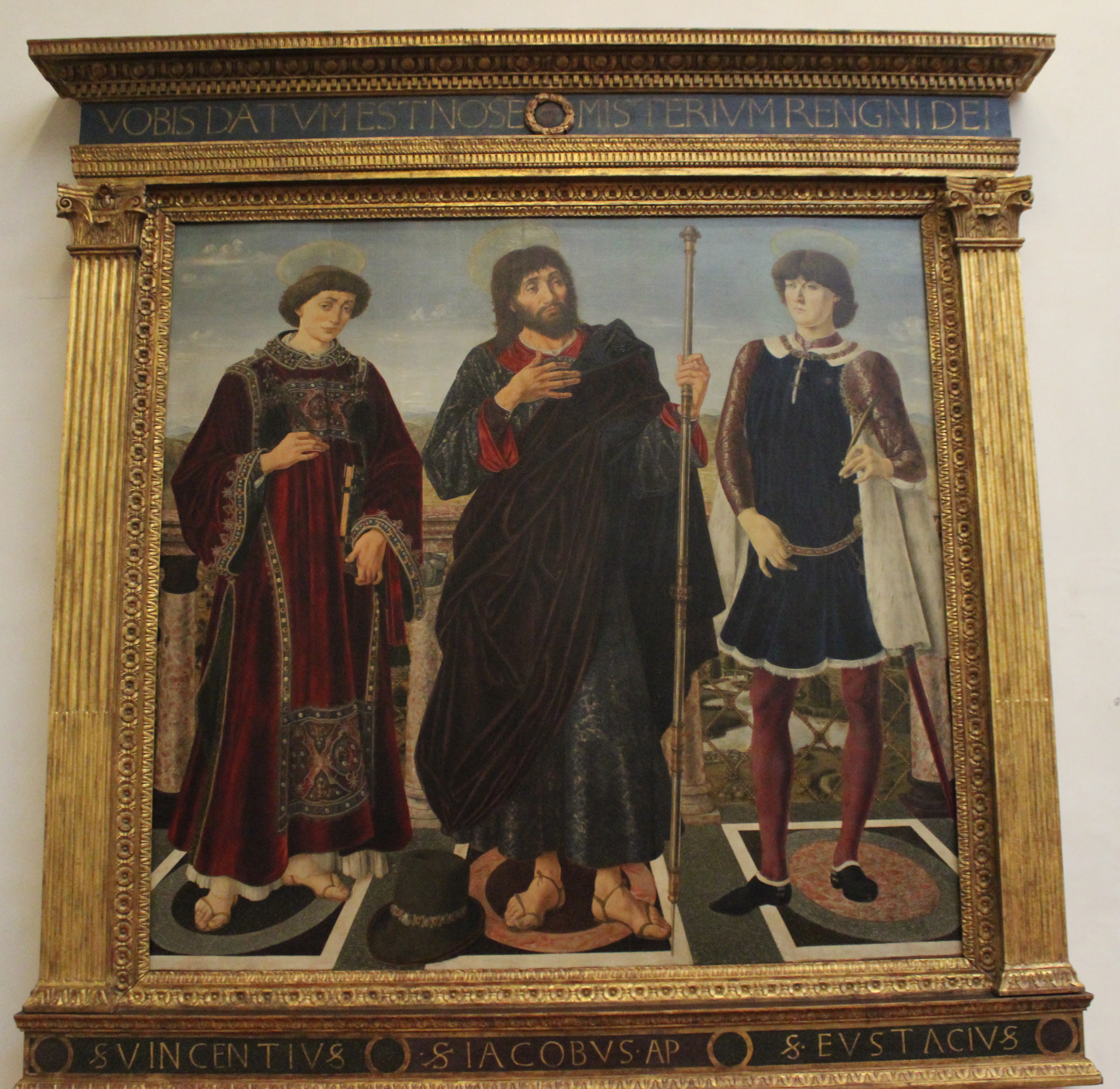
In the original elaborate frame, in the Uffizi

The Cardinal of Portugal's Altarpiece (Italian: Pala del cardinale del Portogallo), or the Altarpiece for the Cardinal of Portugal's Chapel, is a painting of c. 1466 in tempera and oil on panel by one or both of the brothers Antonio and Piero del Pollaiuolo. It was painted for the altar in the Cardinal of Portugal's Chapel, a funerary chapel in the church of San Miniato al Monte in Florence, built for the prince and cardinal James of Portugal, who died in exile in Florence in 1459 at the age of 26.

The painting is now in the Uffizi in Florence, with a copy in place in the chapel. Aspects of the painting reflect and connect with the setting it was made for, an elaborate newly-built funerary chapel, which in the Renaissance Republic of Florence aspired to revive the imperial style of many centuries before, drawing on the Late Antique monuments of Ravenna.

== Description ==
The painting shows Saints Vincent, James the Great and Eustace, standing on a terrace high above a landscape background, of which little can be seen. The parts visible, mostly around Saint Eustace's legs, have been described as "minutely observed ... small vignettes of the River Arno valley", like other early Italian landscapes drawing on precedents from Early Netherlandish painting.

Saint Vincent, shown in his deacon's vestments, was patron saint of the archdiocese of Lisbon, of which James had been appointed "administrator in perpetuity" by the pope in 1453, being too young to be made the Archbishop of Lisbon. Sant'Eustachio in Rome was James's titular church as cardinal, explaining Saint Eustace's presence, and Saint James was his name-saint. James looks to the viewer's right, towards the cardinal's tomb in the chapel. As well as these connections to the cardinal, they are all martyrs from the Early Christian period.

Their clothes are all rich, and Saint James's felt hat with a jewelled hatband (at his feet) "fashionable". There is a "precocious sensitivity in the representation of fabric textures—the plush velvets of St Vincent's robe and St Eustace's doublet, with its white fur lining, the costly brocades worn by both St Eustace and St James".

== Authorship and date ==
The painting is one of a number which have been attributed to both Antonio and Piero del Pollaiuolo, or to both working together. Francesco Albertini, writing in 1510, attributes this painting and others to Piero alone, but Giorgio Vasari, in his joint biography of the brothers, describes it and other works as collaborative efforts by them both. Bernard Berenson allowed that the painting was by all by Piero, whom he regarded as a much inferior talent, but to the design of Antonio.

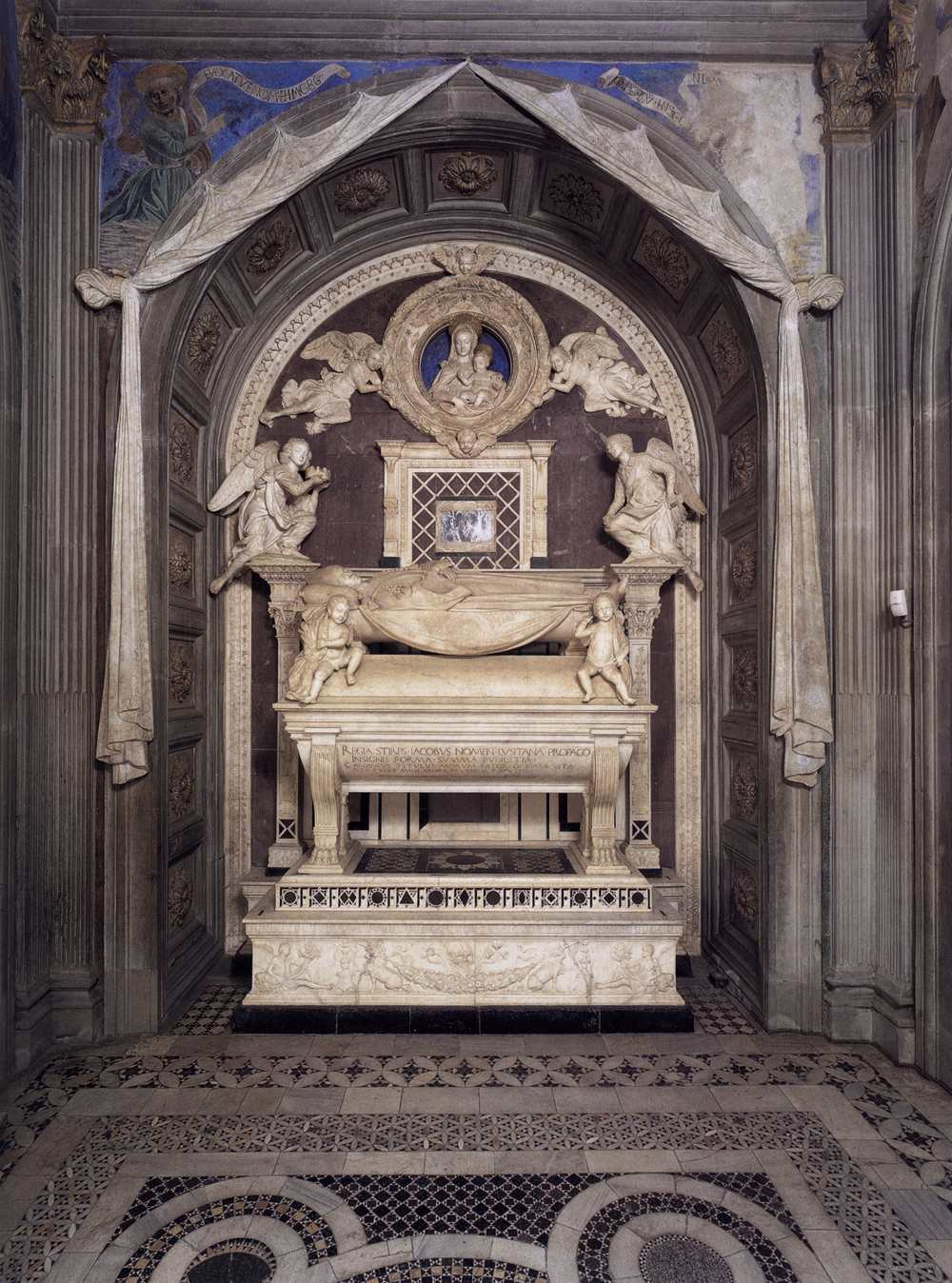
The cardinal's tomb, in the arm of the chapel to the right of the altarpiece

In the 20th century it became usual to give Antonio the main share, but in recent years it has been ascribed to Piero alone by Aldo Galli. The Uffizi still attributes it to both brothers, but Galli's re-attributions have been accepted by other museums, such as the National Gallery for their Apollo and Daphne, which they now attribute to Piero alone.

The paintings were commissioned and executed between 1466 and 1468.

== Context ==
The Infante James of Portugal was a prince of the House of Aviz, grandson of King John I of Portugal. His father, Peter, Duke of Coimbra, had served as regent for the young King Afonso V of Portugal, who had married Peter's daughter (James's sister) Isabel of Coimbra (d. 1455). However, after Alfonso reached his majority in 1448, he became hostile towards Peter, who soon rebelled. James, then 15, was captured at the Battle of Alfarrobeira, where his father was killed. He was eventually released, after pleas from his aunt, Isabella of Portugal, Duchess of Burgundy to whose court he went, later embarking on a career in the church.

The altarpiece formed part of an elaborate scheme of decoration in the newly built chapel. The Pollaiuolo brothers were also commissioned to paint other elements of the chapel walls, parts of which also used oil painting; on the walls this has not survived very well. The tomb on one wall has a marble effigy over a sarcophagus by Antonio Rossellino.

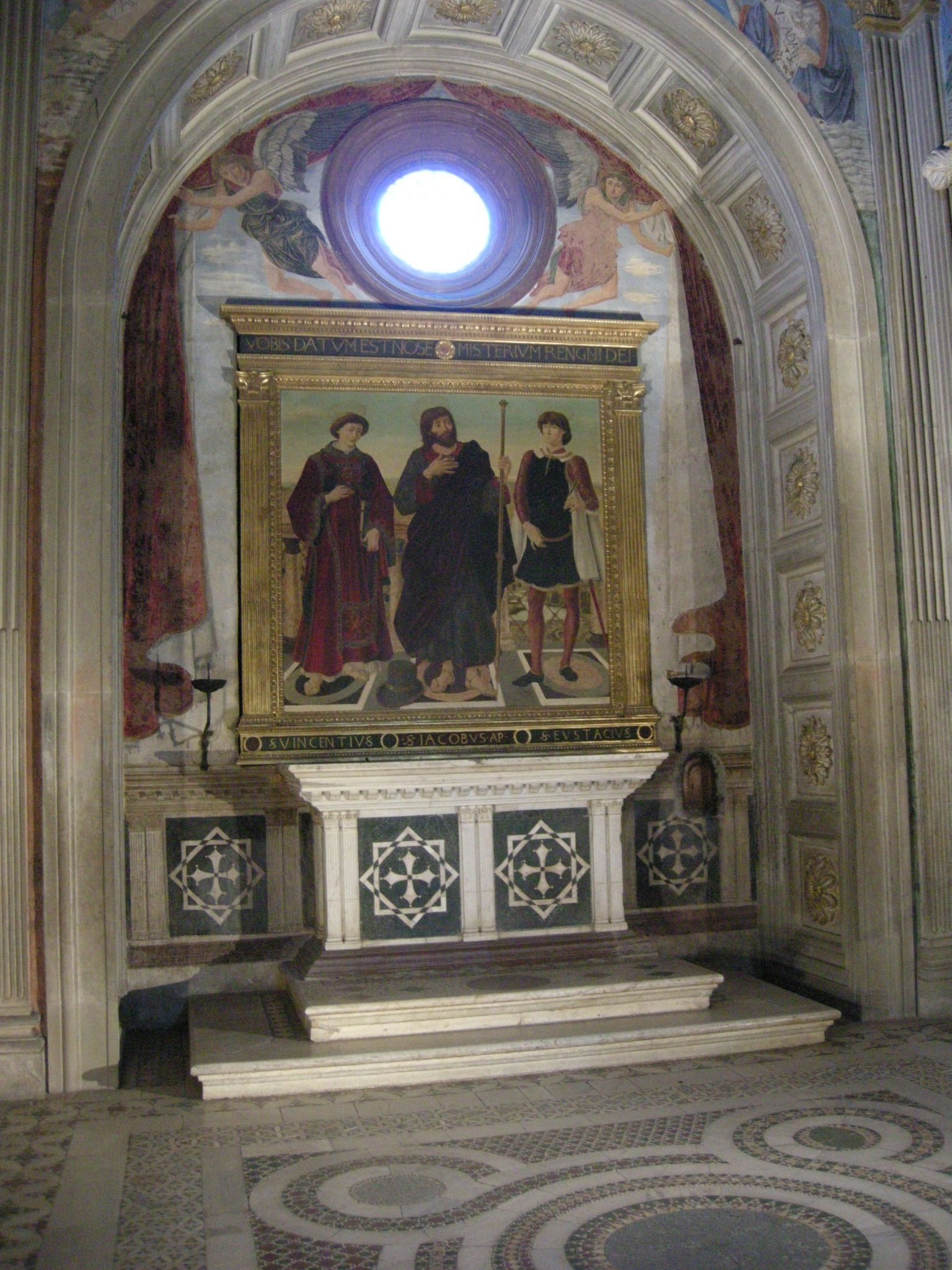
The replica altarpiece in the chapel

Linda Koch has suggested that the overall architectural design and decoration of the chapel represented an attempt to evoke Early Christianity, and was much influenced by the imperially sponsored churches of Ravenna. In terms of the altarpiece, apart from the unusual general richness of the saints' clothing, and their rather static poses, each stands on a rota or circle of the most valuable and luxurious architectural stones, from the left: serpentine, porphyry, and a "mottled tan marble". These echo the rotae of real porphyry on the Cosmatesque floor of the chapel, and in the tomb on the surface below the sarcophagus, and evoke imperial monuments of the ancient past.

The cardinal's relations were keen to have him memorialized in a grand fashion, appropriate for his rank in both church and royalty. His own resources could not fund this, but both the Republic of Florence and his family were ready to step in to fund the funeral and, over the following years, the chapel. Funds came from his mother and sister, but mainly his aunt Isabella of Portugal, Duchess of Burgundy. We know something of the arrangements from the records of the banker who coordinated them, unearthed by Gino Corti in an archive some decades ago. The Tomb of Antipope John XXIII of the 1420s is another case where the Florentine authorities were willing, even keen, to make space for, and partly fund, a large monument for an individual with high status outside the city.

== Oil ==
Modern technical analysis has shown that the painting uses oil painting with linseed oil, still relatively unusual in Italy at this date, but used in other works by the Pollaiuolo brothers.

== Frame ==
The original gilded wood frame in a classical style is by Giuliano da Maiano; the three saints are named at the bottom (S[ANCTUS] VINCENTIVS / S[ANCTUS] IACOBVS AP[OSTVLVS] / S[ANCTUS] EVSTACIVS), with a quotation from the Gospel of Mark along the top (VOBIS DATVM EST NOS[S]E / MISTERIVM REGNI DEI; Mark 4:11 "Et dicebat eis: Vobis datum est nosse mysterium regni Dei"), in the Authorized Version "Unto you it is given to know the mystery of the kingdom of God".
