= Roma quanta fuit ipsa ruina docet =

Roma quanta fuit ipsa ruina docet is a Latin phrase which roughly translates to, "How great Rome was, its very ruins tell."

== Origin ==
The first known appearance of the maxim is in Francesco Albertini's Opusculum.

The phrase appears on the title page of the seven books on architecture by Sebastiano Serlio. Dutch Painter Maarten van Heemskerck wrote the phrase on his drawing of the Septizonium. Architect and author Peter Murray theorized that Heemskerck's use of the phrase might have been the first, writing, "It is ironical that his drawings of the Septizonium are not only the most important documents for its appearance, but it was one of these very drawings that he chose to bear the mysterious epigram—perhaps invented by him—Roma quanta fuit ipsa ruina docet."
