= Martyrdom of Saint Sebastian (Pollaiuolo) =

Painting by Antonio and Piero del Pollaiuolo

The Martyrdom of Saint Sebastian
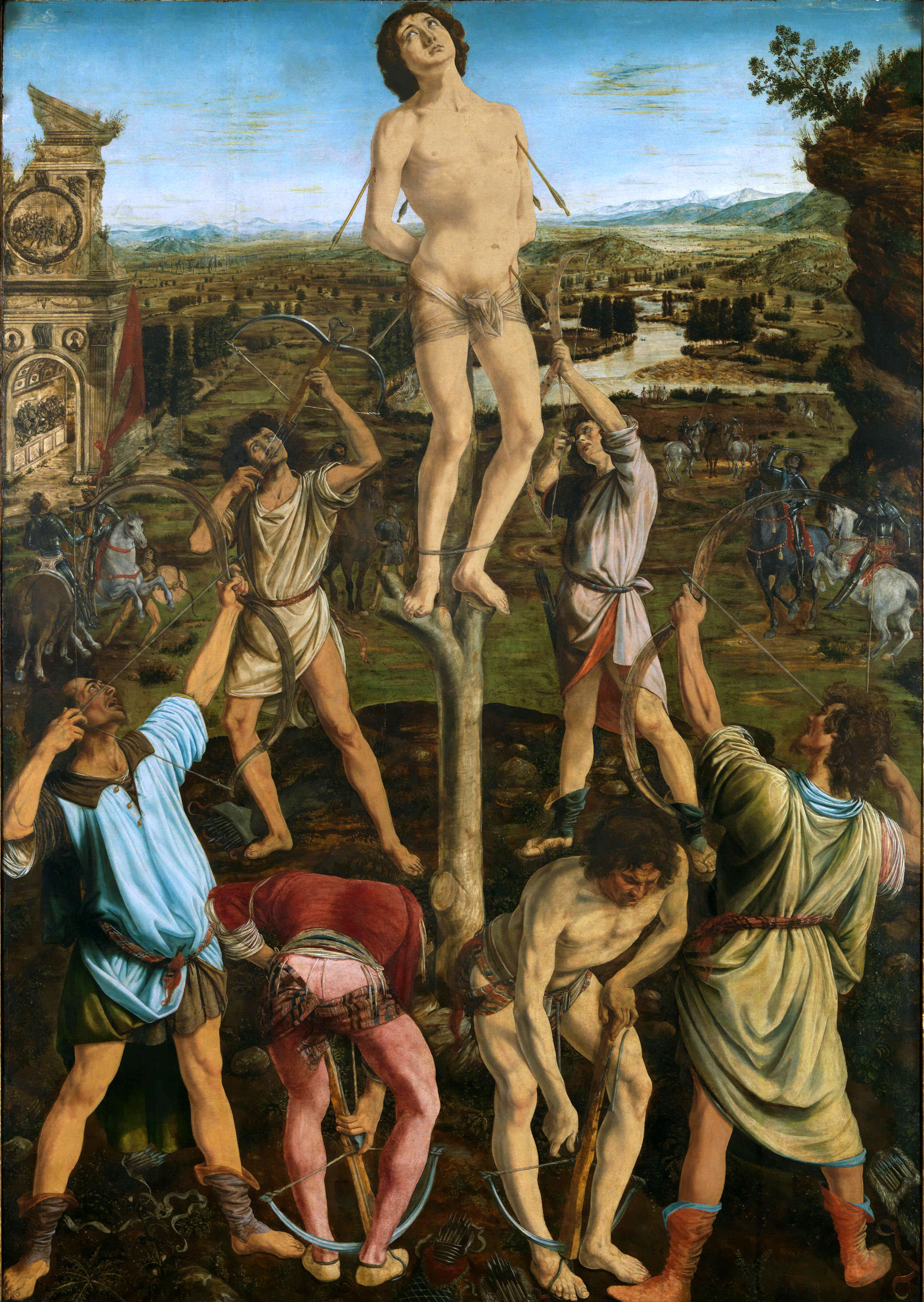
- Artist: Antonio and Piero del Pollaiuolo
- Year: After 1475
- Medium: Oil on canvas
- Dimensions: 291.5 cm × 202.6 cm (114.8 in × 79.8 in)
- Location: National Gallery; London

The Martyrdom of Saint Sebastian is a large altarpiece by the brothers Antonio and Piero del Pollaiuolo, commissioned by the Florentine Pucci family and now in the National Gallery, London.

== History ==
The Pucci family commissioned the work as the altarpiece for the family chapel, the oratory dedicated to Saint Sebastian in the church of Santissima Annunziata, Florence. Giorgio Vasari dates it to 1475, attributing it solely to Antonio del Pollaiuolo, but it is today usually seen as a joint work, no doubt also involving assistants from their workshops.

Roberto Pucci withdrew the work from the oratory on the pretext of restoration but then in 1857 sold it to the National Gallery.

== Analysis ==
The painting is considered Antonio's masterpiece, with a more rigid geometric control on the composition than in his previous works, without giving up his usual naturalness of poses and movement – the four archers in the foreground form two symmetrical poses, with the two central ones reloading and the two on the edges firing, in perfect equilibrium either side of the central post to which Sebastian is tied.

It can be contrasted with its near-contemporary, the Saint Sebastian by Botticelli, which instead puts the figure of the saint in isolation in a Flemish-inspired landscape. Francesco Botticini's Saint Sebastian, formerly attributed to Andrea del Castagno and dated to the years immediately after 1474, borrows from the Botticelli.

== Gallery ==
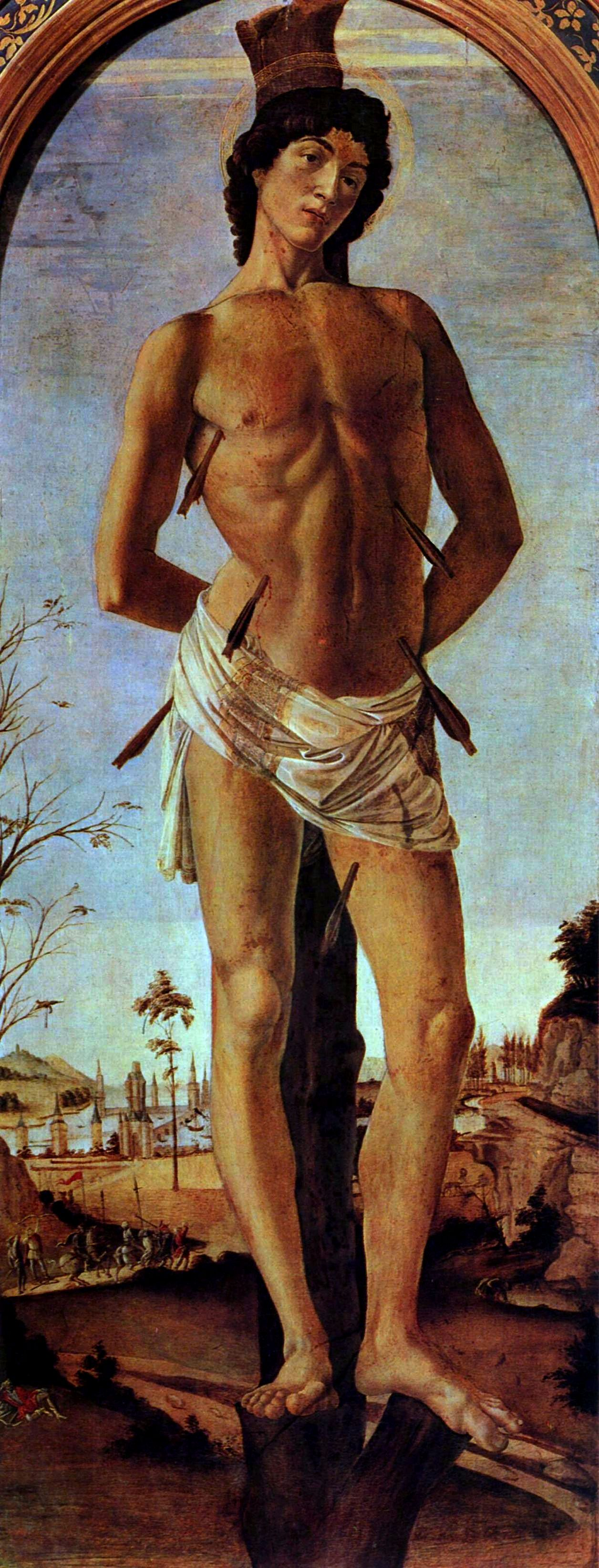
Sandro Botticelli, Saint Sebastian, Gemäldegalerie, Berlin, 1474

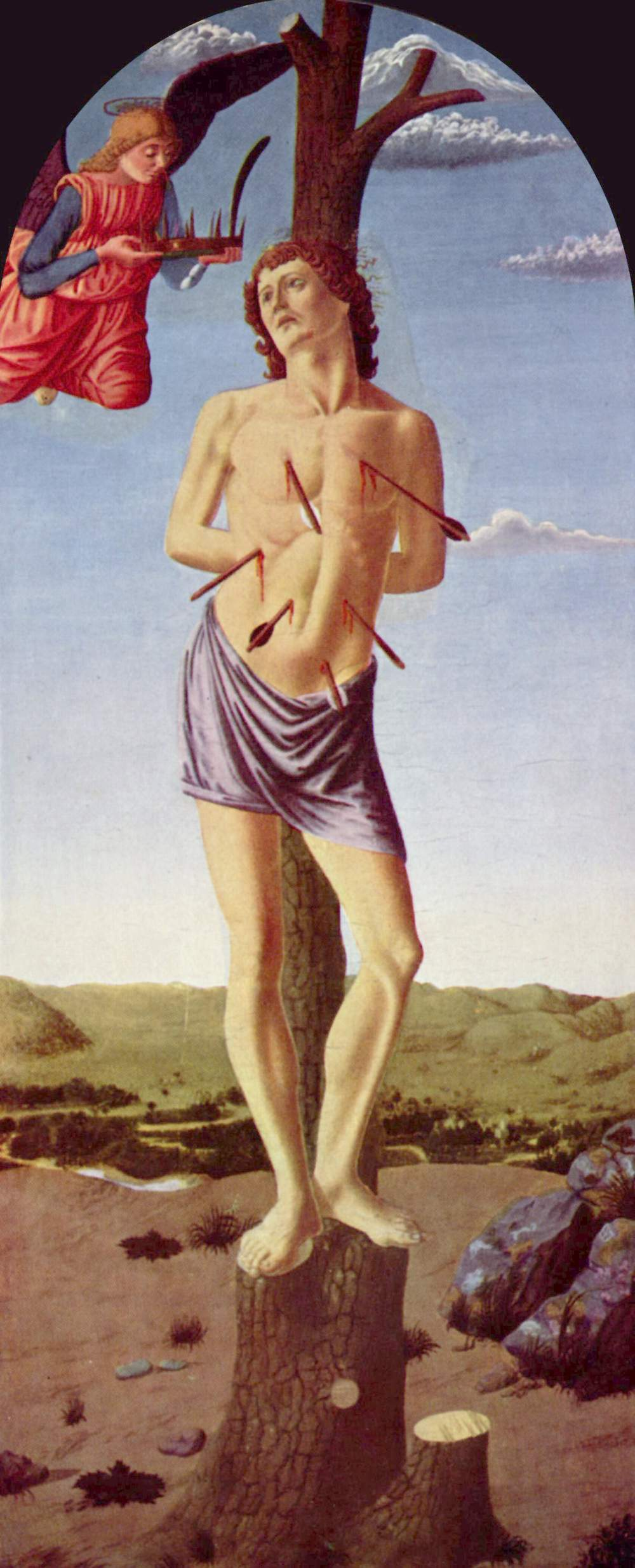
Francesco Botticini, Saint Sebastian, Metropolitan Museum of Art, New York, after 1474
