= Portrait of Galeazzo Maria Sforza =

1471 portrait by Piero del Pollaiuolo

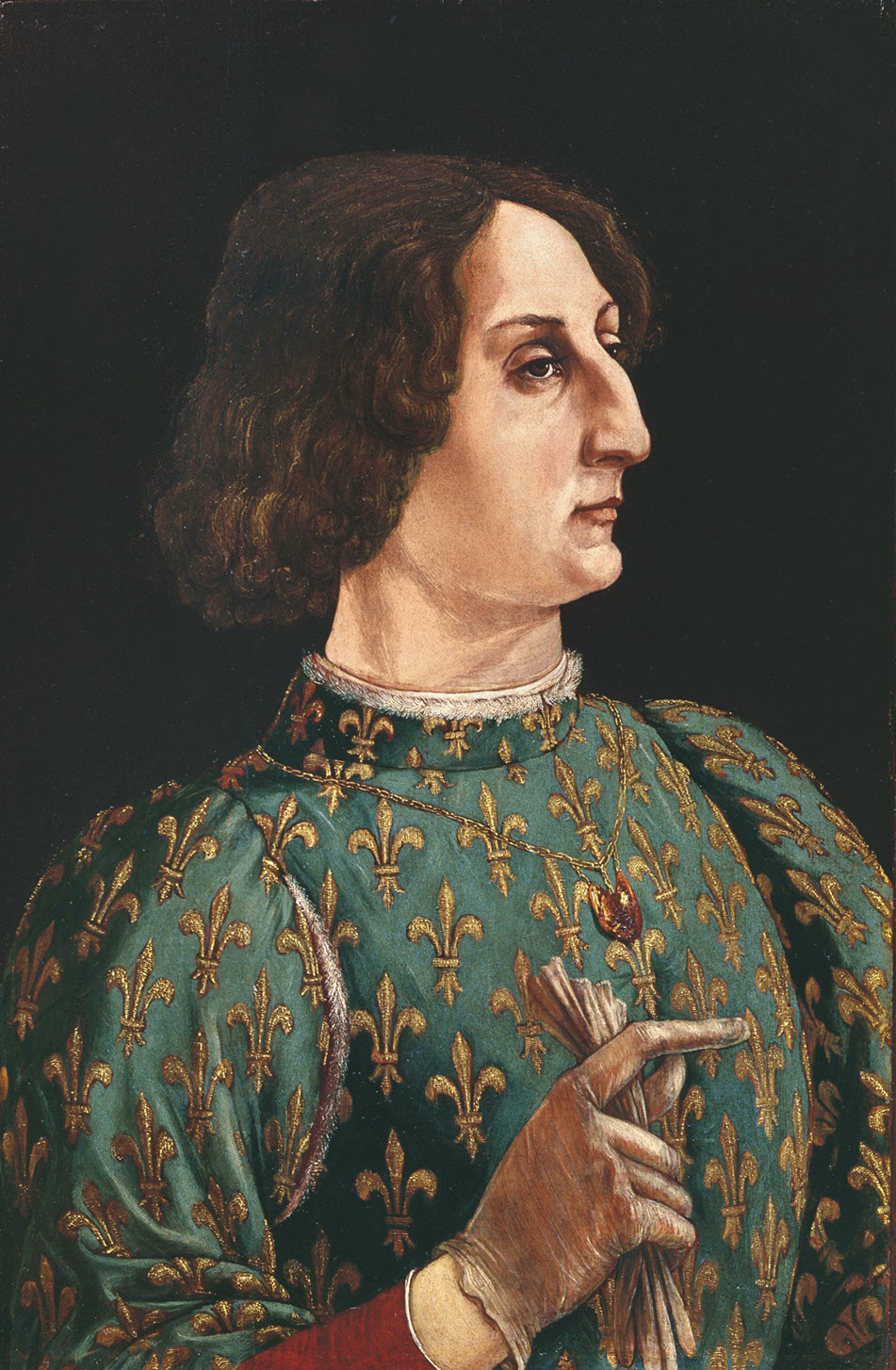
Portrait of Galeazzo Maria Sforza (1471) by Piero del Pollaiuolo

Portrait of Galeazzo Maria Sforza is an oil on panel painting by Piero del Pollaiuolo, now in the Uffizi in Florence.

It was produced in 1471 on Galeazzo Maria Sforza's third visit to Florence to strengthen his alliance with Lorenzo the Magnificent. The chronicles of the time refer to his entering the city on 13 March that year wearing "a blue brocade with lilies, as the French device and arms" - it is this costume that appears in the portrait.

The work was restored in 1994, showing that it had been painted directly onto an unprepared panel in the Flemish manner. It may thus have originally formed a diptych with a portrait of Federico da Montefeltro, duke of Urbino - both works were recorded in the "camera di Lorenzo" in a 1492 inventory of the Palazzo Medici.
