= Sant'Agostino, San Gimignano =

Church in San Gimignano, Italy

Coordinates: 43°28′14.53″N 11°02′30.14″E

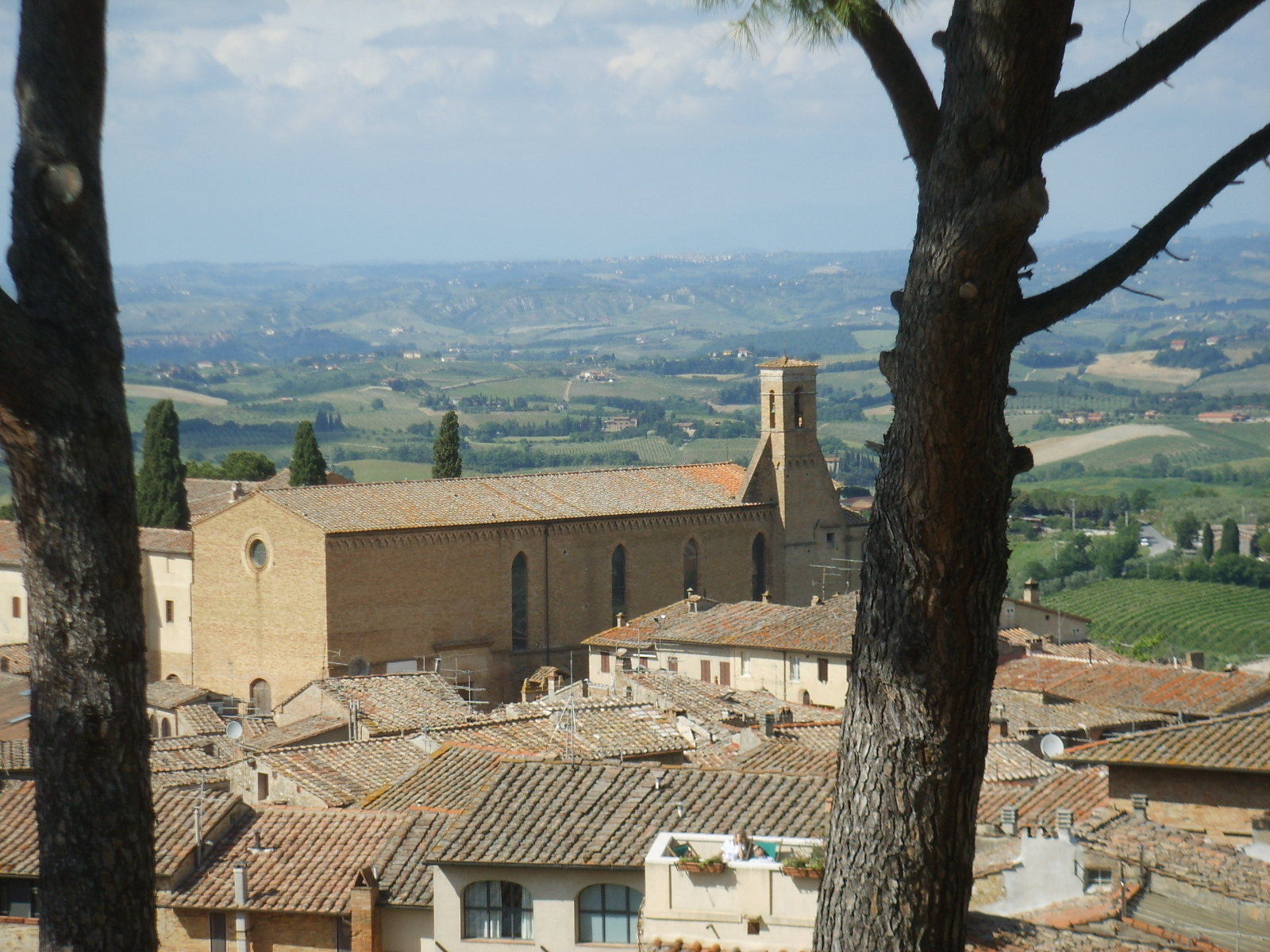
Sant'Agostino seen from the castle

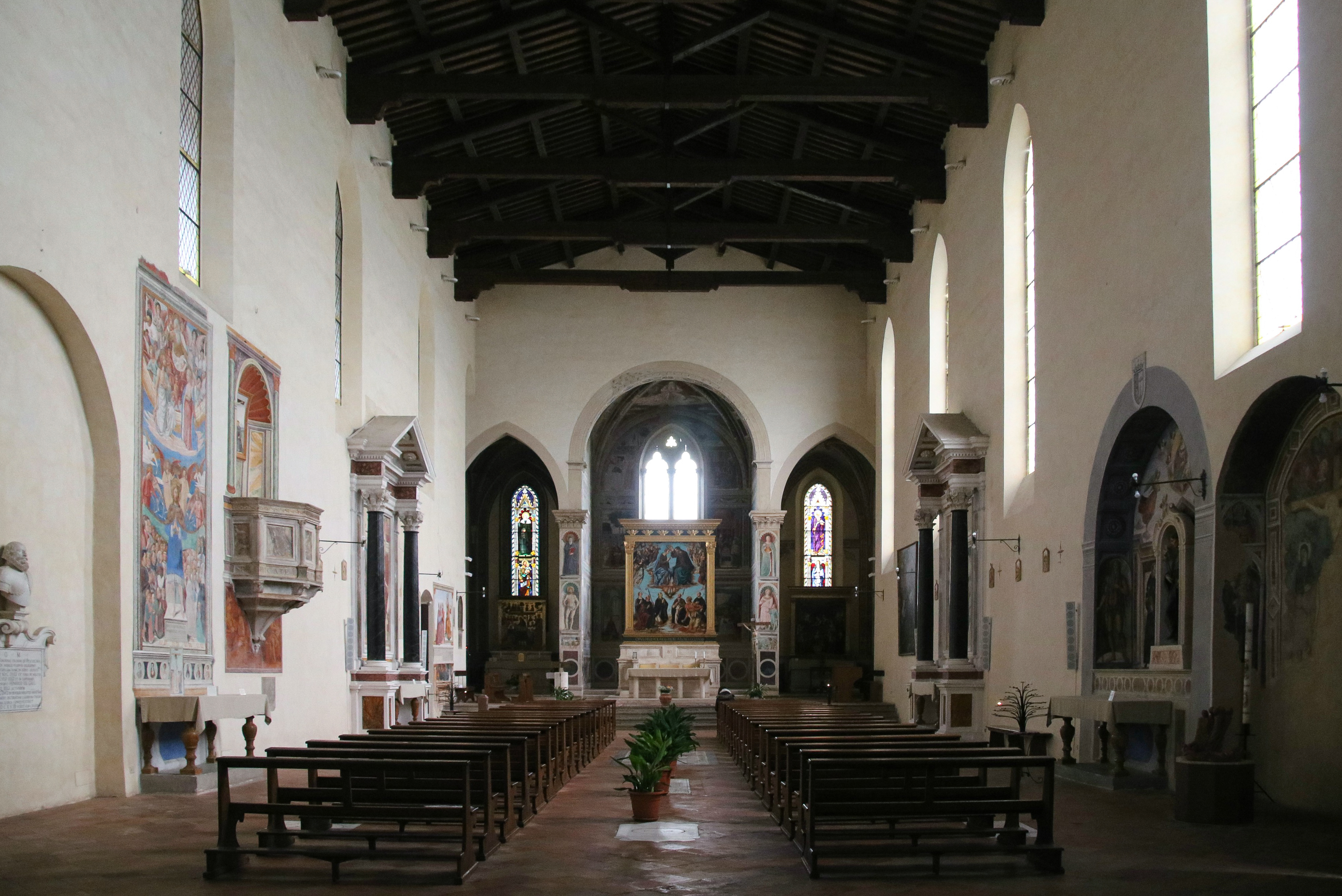
Interior

The chiesa di Sant'Agostino (Church of St Augustine) is the second largest church in San Gimignano, Italy, after the Collegiata. It is owned by the Order of Saint Augustine.

Sant'Agostino is an imposing 13th-century building. The interior is a large hall dominated by the seventeen-panel fresco cycle on The Life of St Augustine in the apse around the high altar, painted by Benozzo Gozzoli between 1463 and 1467. By Benozzo is also a votive fresco of Saint Sebastian commissioned by the Augustinians after the 1464 plague. Unlike traditional depictions of the saint as a martyr, he is shown in a tunicle and large cloak, shielding the population praying at his feet. A painted inscription on the floor dates the work to July 28, 1464. There are a number of other Quattrocento frescoes in the church.

The Renaissance altarpiece by Piero del Pollaiuolo depicts the Coronation of the Virgin (1483). The Cappella di San Bartolo houses the remains of the eponymous saint (1228–1300), a lay Franciscan who died of leprosy. The magnificent altar in the chapel was created by Benedetto da Maiano.

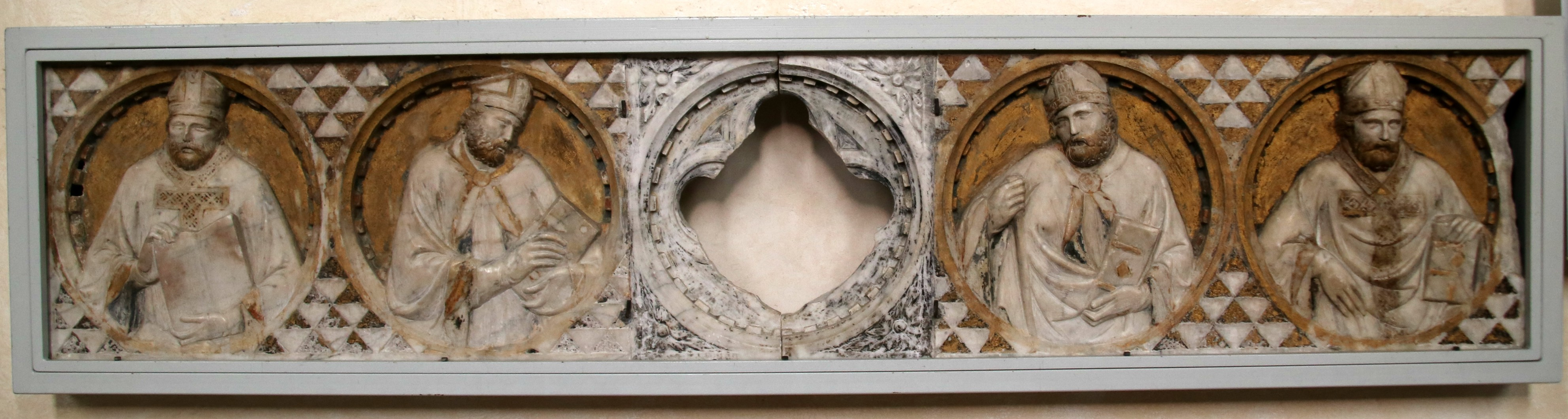
Tino di Camaino, busts of four bishops, quatrefoil in between originally held reliquaries of Saint Bartholomew, early 14th century

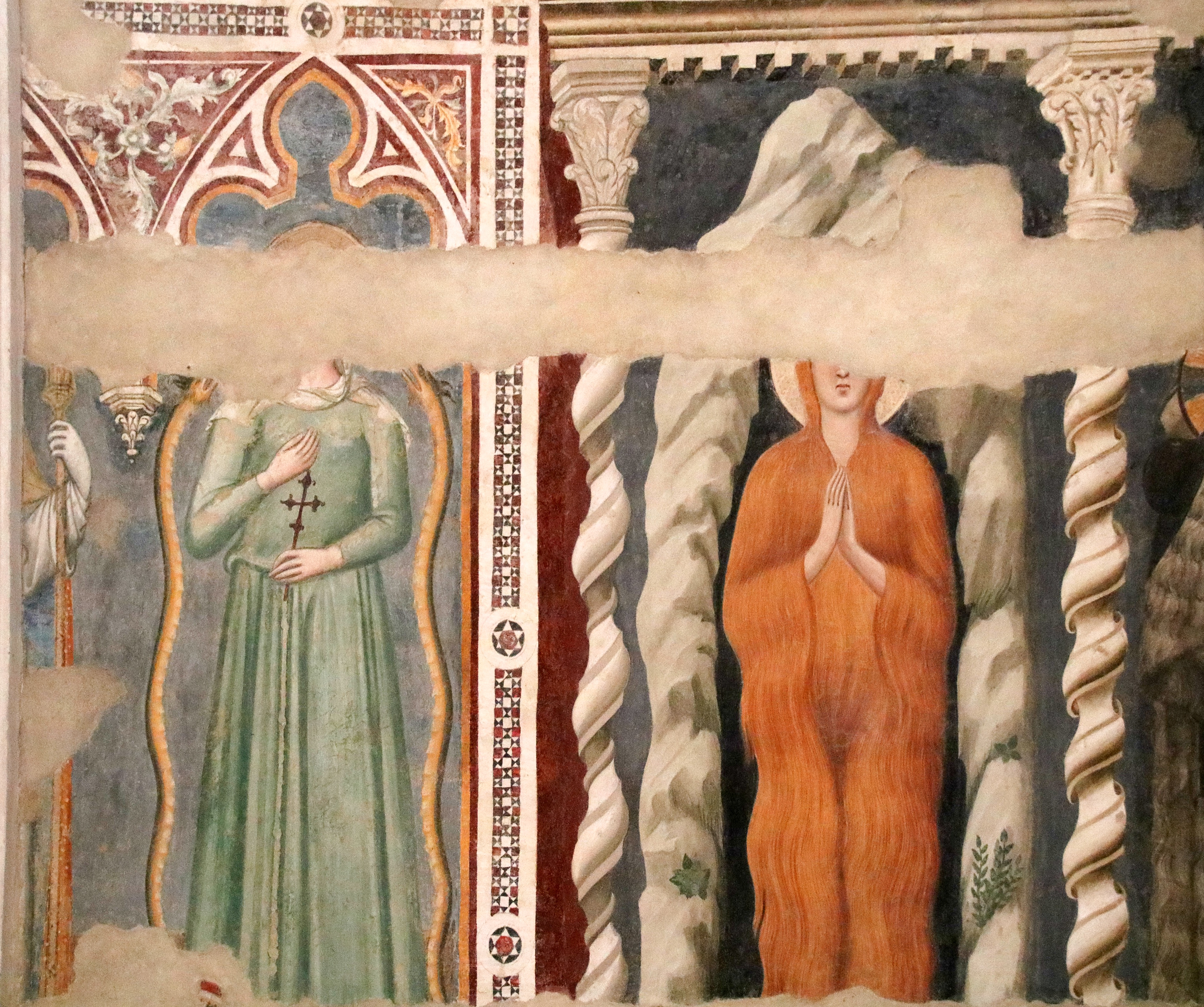
Bartolo di Fredi, St. Verdiana (1374?), and St. Mary Magdalene by Lippo Memmi (1340s?)

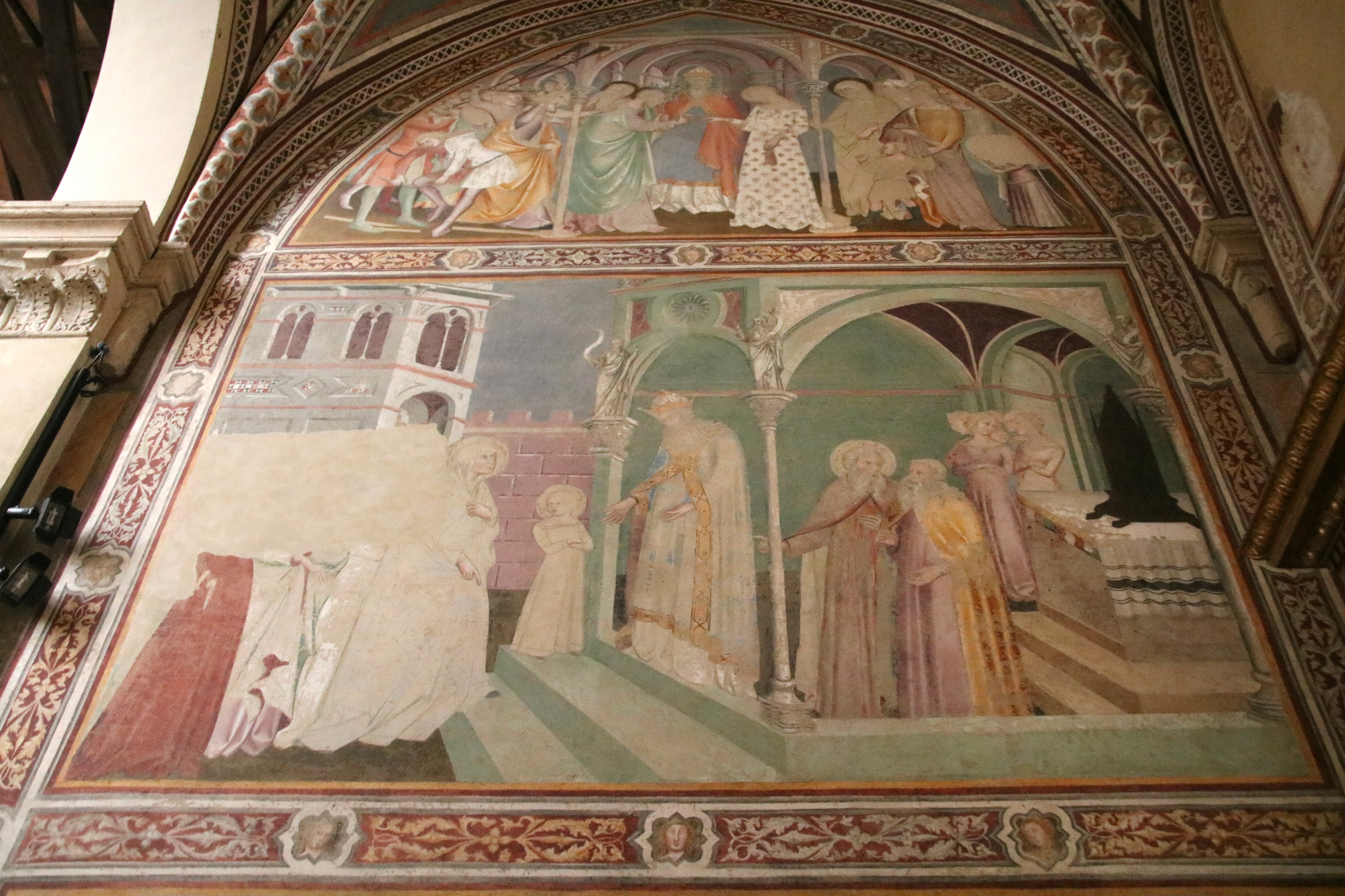
Bartolo di Fredi, Marriage of the Virgin and her Presentation in the Temple, 1374, Cappella di S. Guglielmo

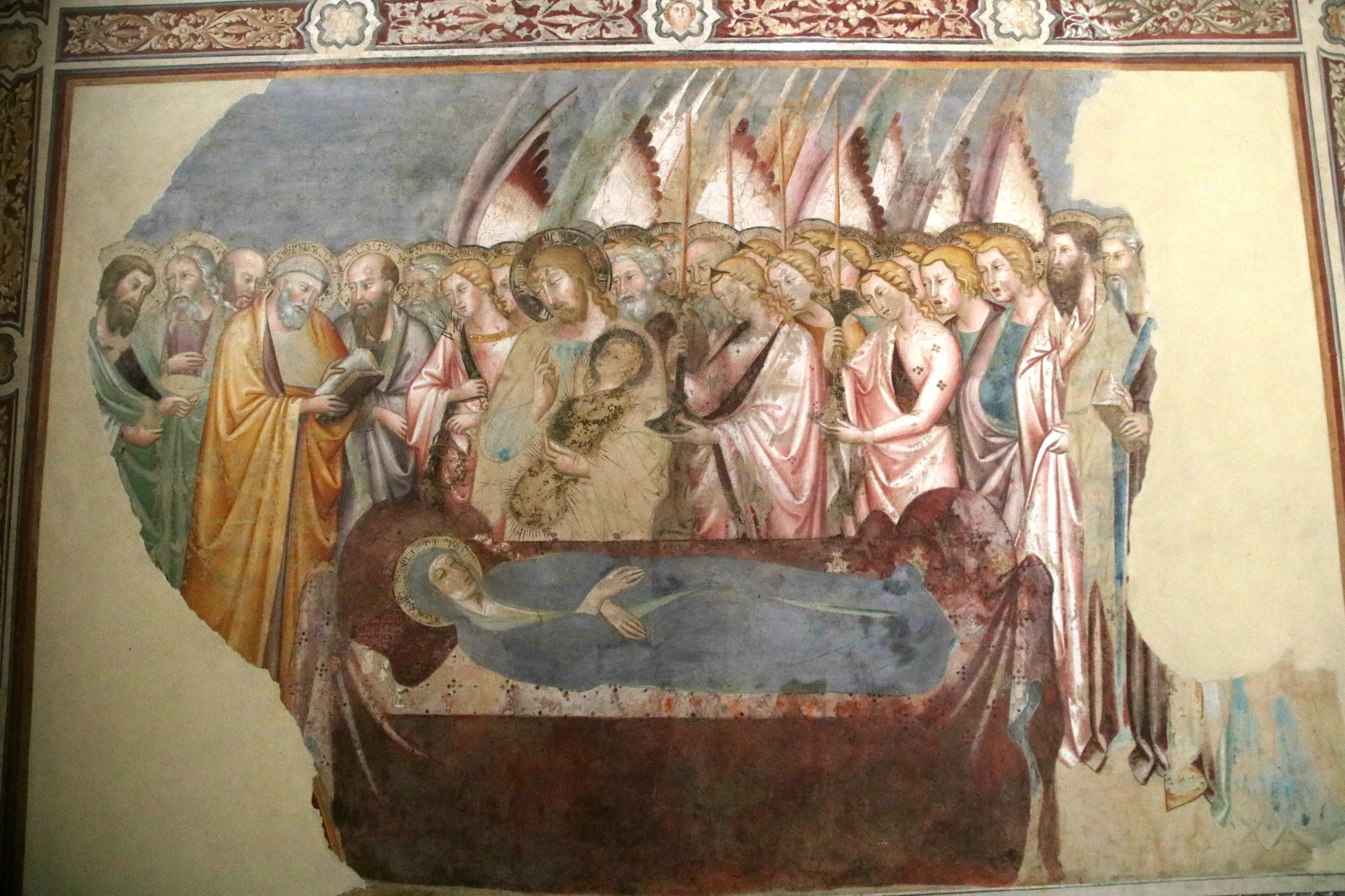
Bartolo di Fredi, Dormitio Virginis, 1374

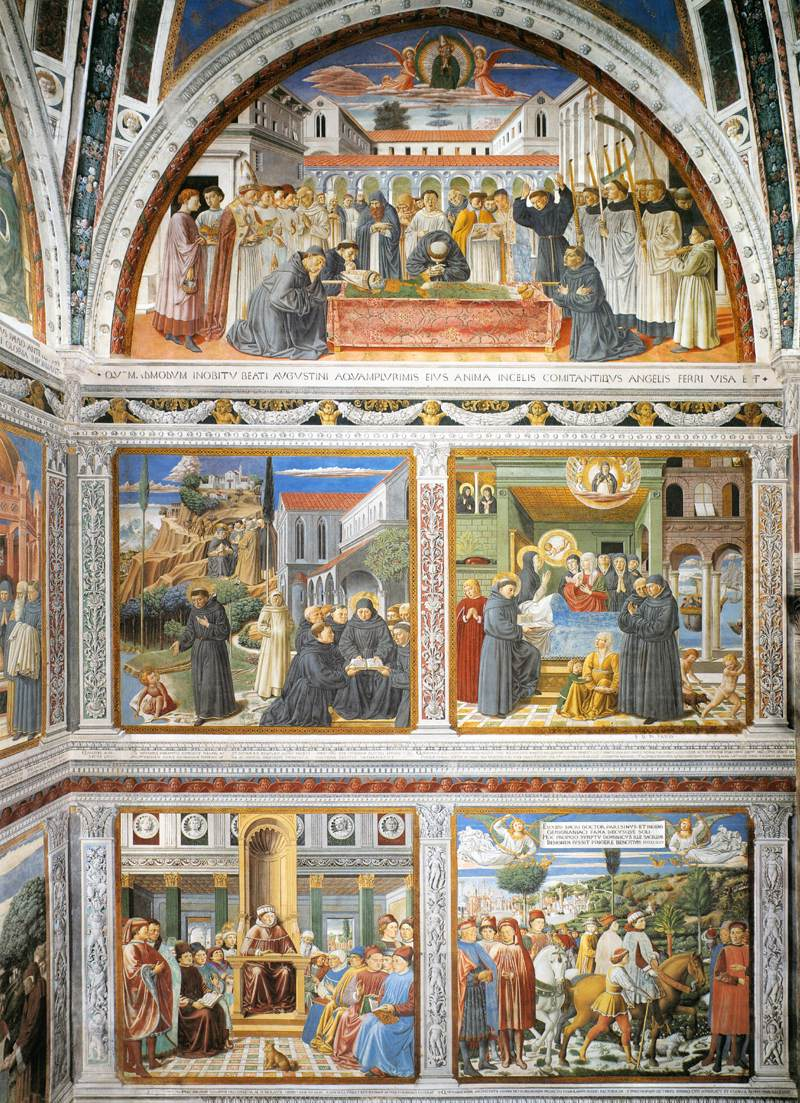
Benozzo Gozzoli, Fresco cycle on the Life of Sant'Agostino (right-hand wall), 1464–65

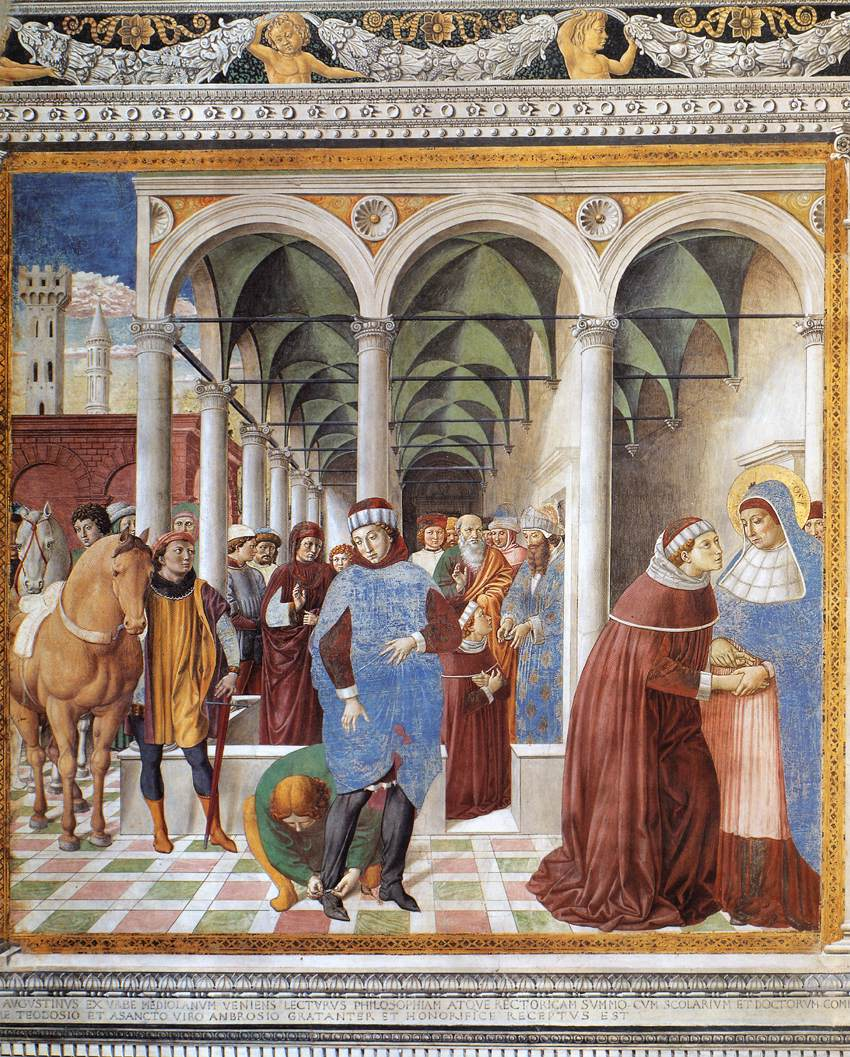
Benozzo Gozzoli, Arrival of St Augustine in Milan (north wall)

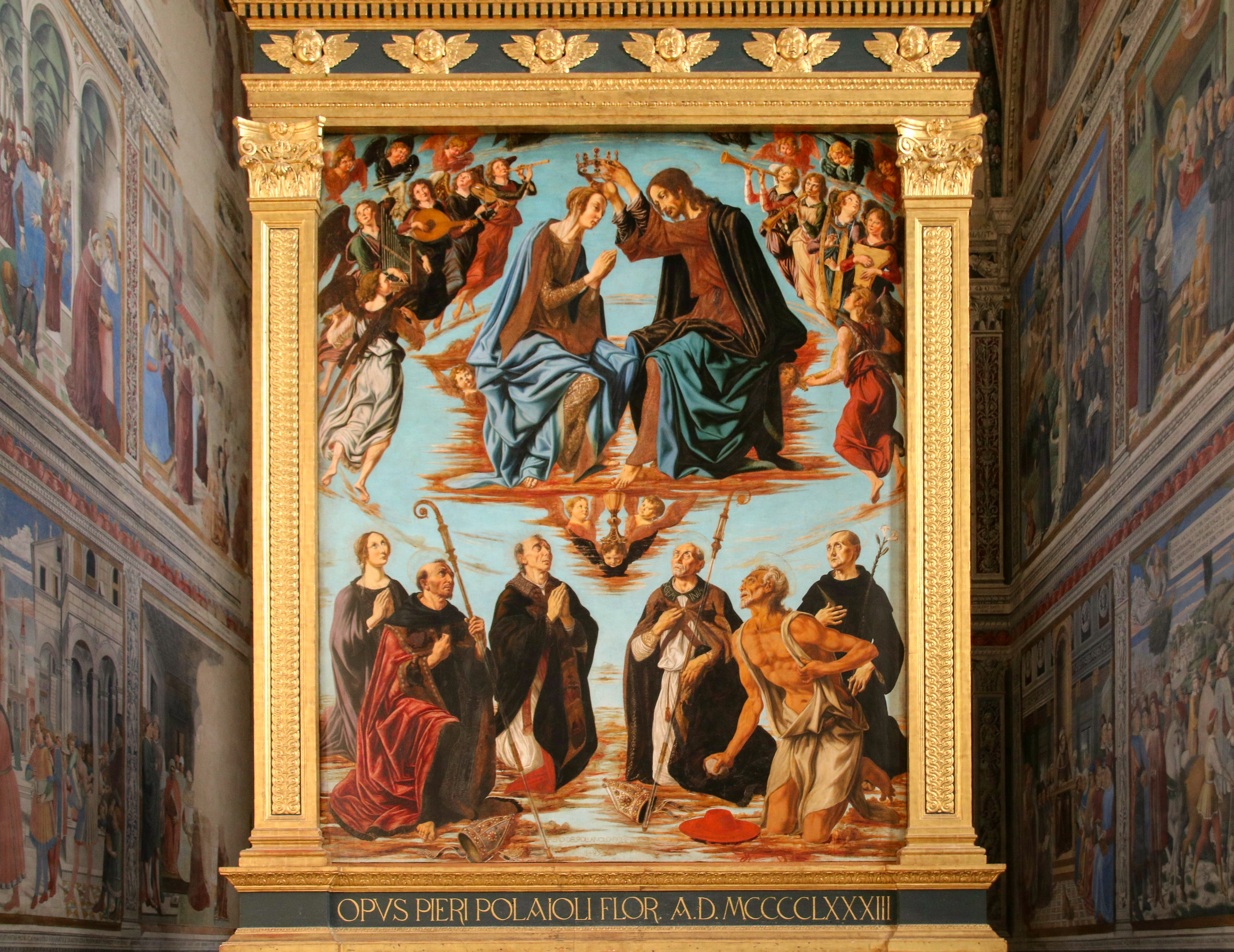
Piero del Pollaiuolo, Incoronation of Mary with Saints Nicolas, Augustine of Hippo, Gimignano, Nicholas of Tolentino and Jerome, 1483

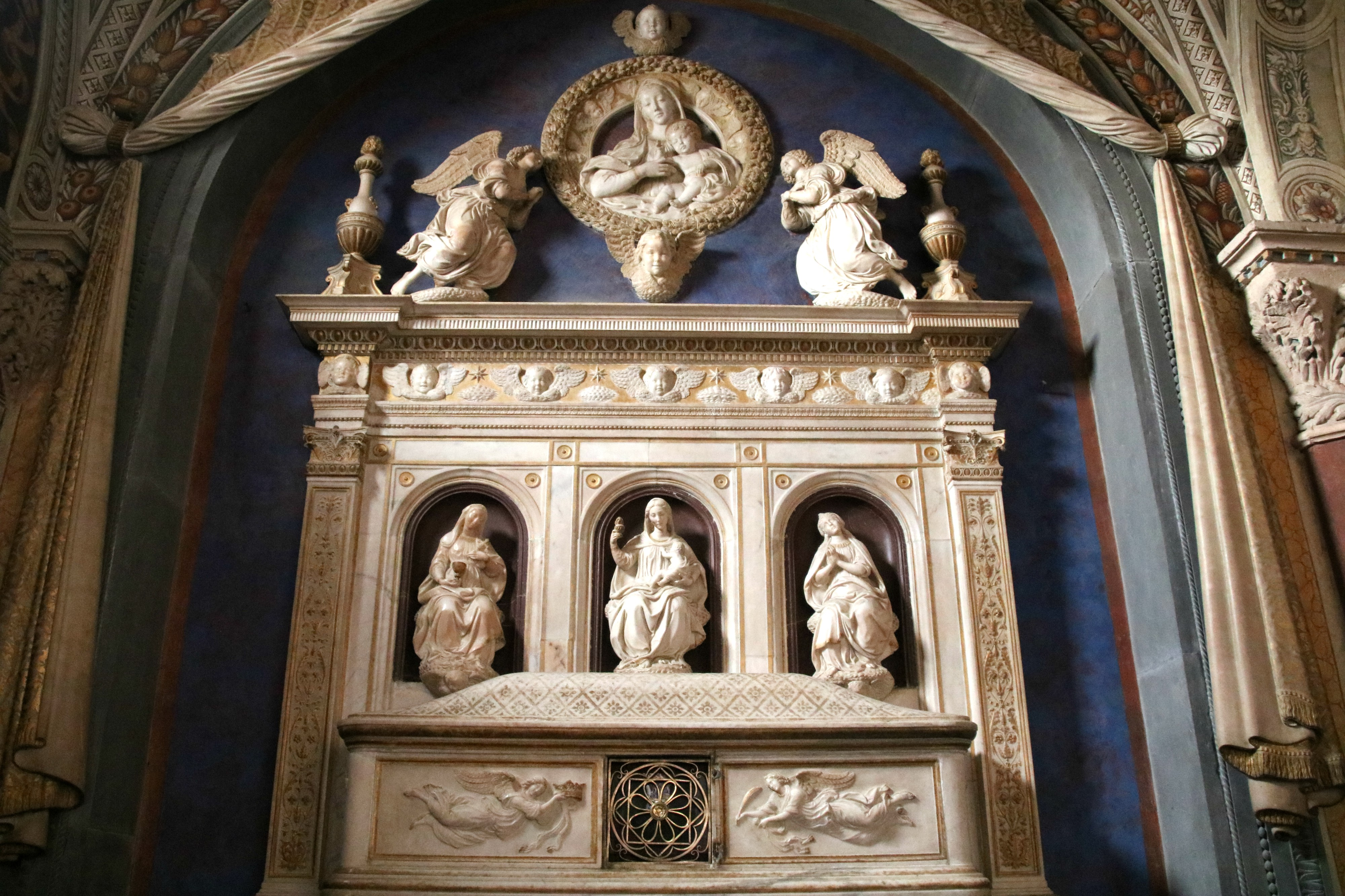
Benedetto da Maiano, altarpiece in the chapel of Saint Bartholomew
