= Coronation of the Virgin (Pollaiuolo) =

1483 painting by Piero del Pollaiuolo

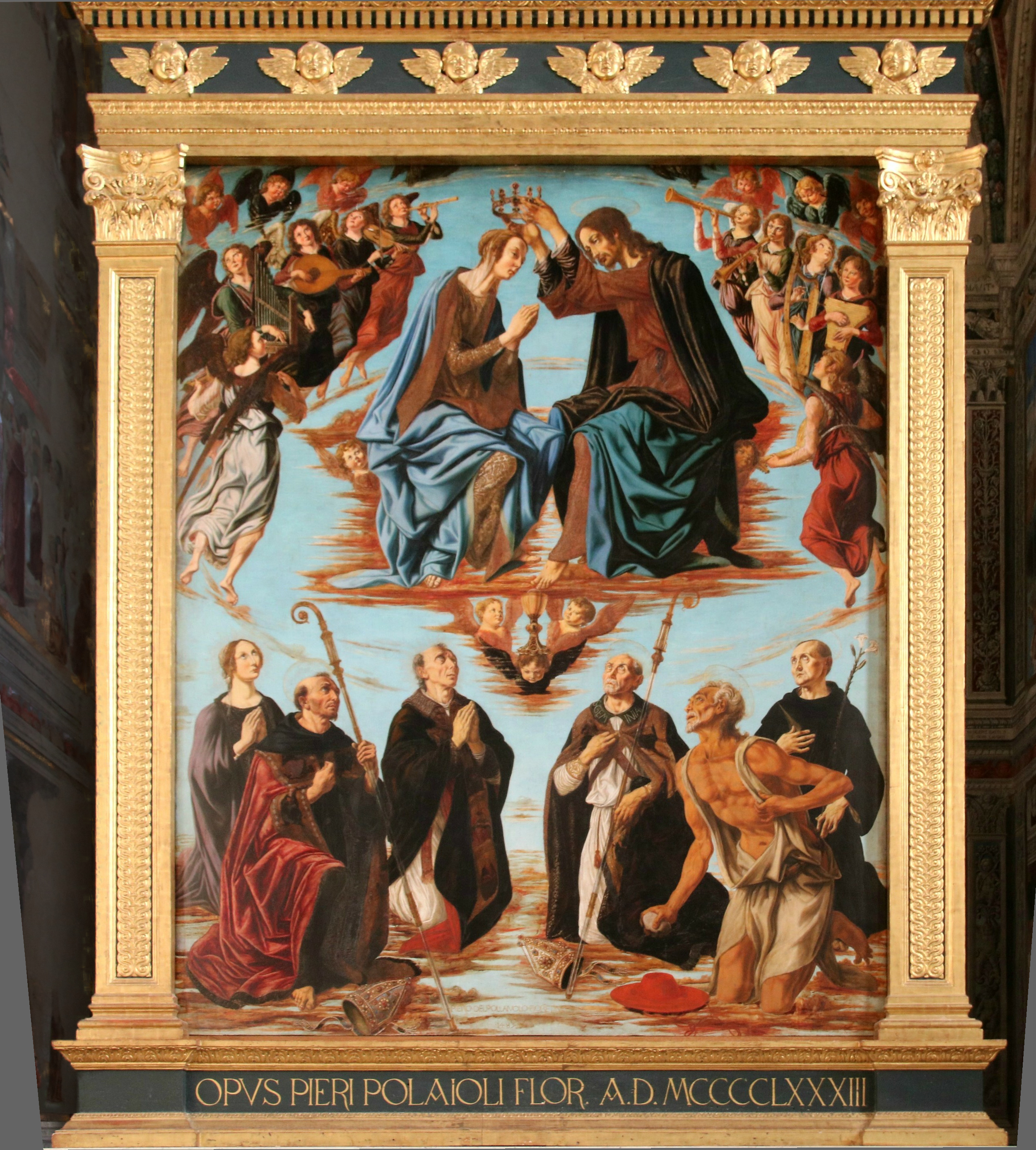
Coronation of the Virgin, 1483

The altarpiece of the Coronation of the Virgin by Piero del Pollaiuolo behind the high altar in the church of Sant'Agostino, San Gimignano in Tuscany, Italy, was painted in 1483. As the painter's only signed and dated work it is a key piece of evidence in the question of which paintings to attribute to Piero and which to his more famous brother, Antonio del Pollaiuolo, which has become a contentious subject in recent years.

The painting is in tempera on panel, although recent technical analysis has shown that linseed oil was also used, a rather early example of oil painting for Florentine painting, found in other paintings by the Pollaiuolo brothers.

== Description ==
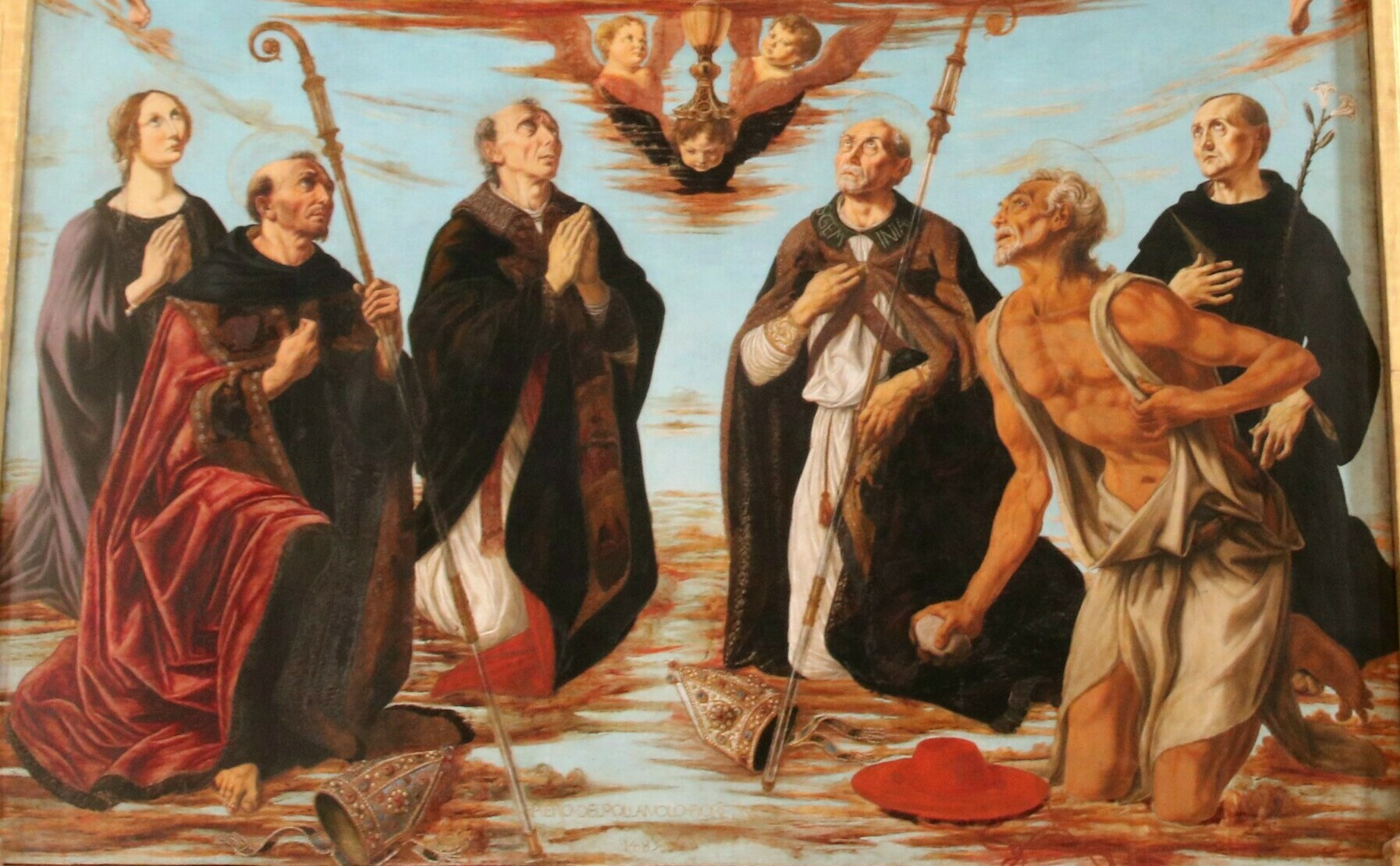
Detail with the saints

The composition has an in aria zone where Christ crowns the Virgin Mary, flanked at a distance by angelic musicians and seraph-heads (body-less putti). Below the clouds on which the main figures are seated putti support a chalice representing the Eucharist; this sits on the head of the lowest. On the ground below kneel six saints with their eyes raised to the sight above. In the front are Saints Augustine (left, dedicatee of the church) and Jerome, and behind Saints Fina (Serafina, from the city, d. 1253), Nicholas of Bari, Geminianus (Gimignano, Bishop of Modena, after whom the city is named), and at right Nicolas of Tolentino (d. 1305), tonsured and holding a lily.

Presumably as St Gimignano is rarely shown in art outside Modena, his name is shown embroidered around his collar. As bishops, Augustine and Gimignano hold crosiers and have laid their mitres on the ground. Nicholas of Bari was also a bishop but here merely wears richly decorated vestments. Jerome's red cardinal's hat is also on the ground; he is shown as a penitent in the desert, nearly naked to the waist and about to hit himself with a rock, allowing the Pollaiuolos' interest in the body in energetic action to be shown in his pose.

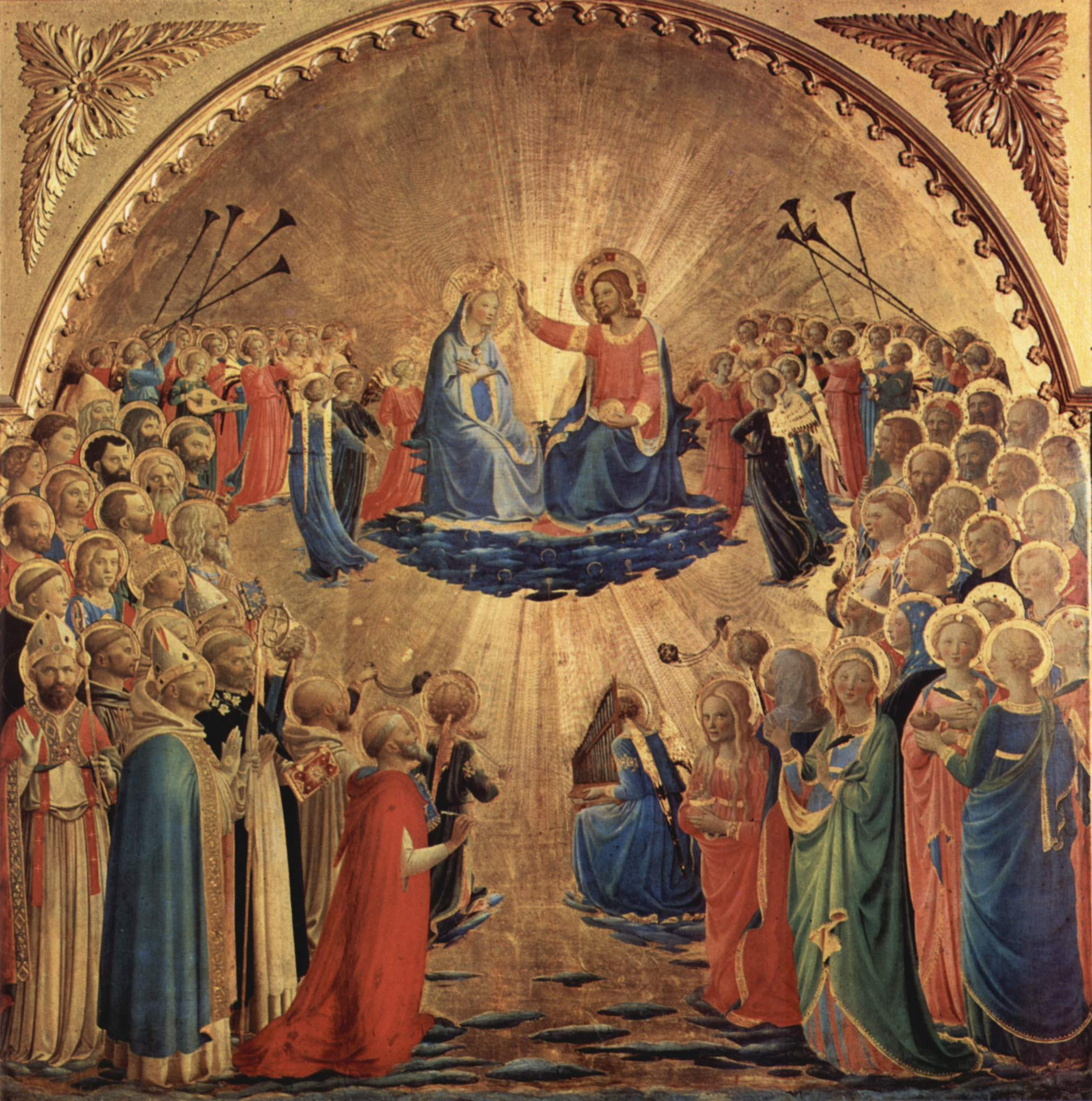
Coronation of c. 1432 by Fra Angelico, now Uffizi

The composition is a less crowded version of that in a Coronation of c. 1432 by Fra Angelico, which was then in a church in Florence, so presumably known to Piero. Previous compositions had shown a similar arrangement of the figures, but with the main figures raised on a high dais, rather than in mid-air. The in aria composition was taken from images of the Assumption of Mary, of which "the Coronation was the culminating episode".

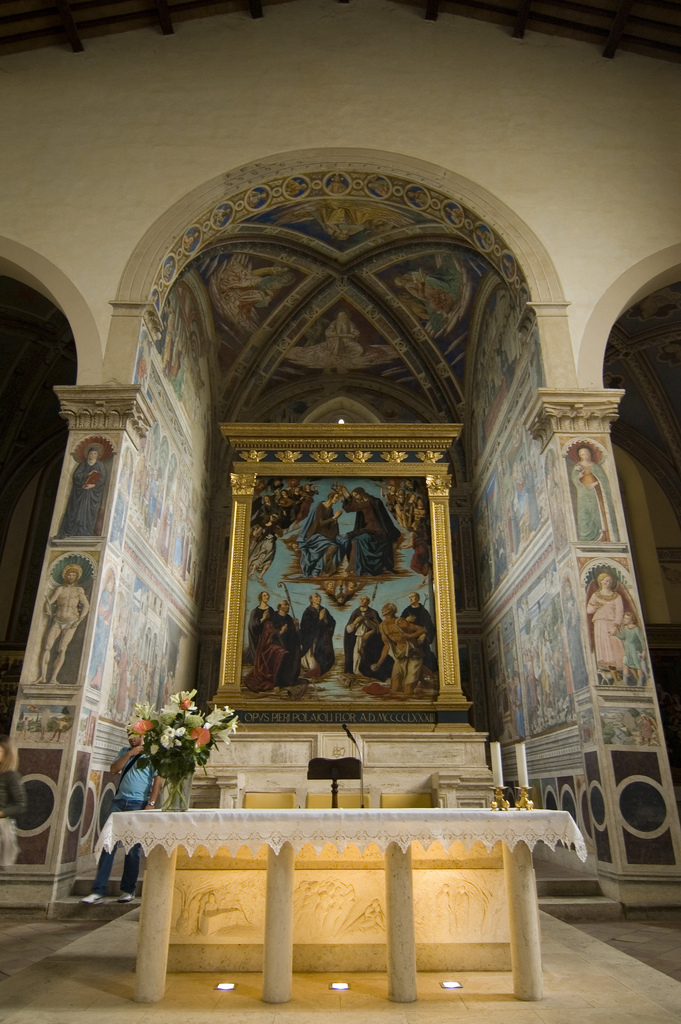
The painting in its current setting

The bottom of the frame carries the Latin inscription "OPVS PIERI POLAIOLI FLOR. A. D. MCCCCLXXXIII" (The work of Piero Pollaiuolo the Florentine, 1483) in large gold letters. A similar inscription with the date in modern style is painted on the ground at bottom centre. At this period works for places away from the artist's native city were often signed in this way, advertising the skill of the painter, and showing the commissioner, here one Domenico Strambi, had gone to the expense of bringing in an artist from a major centre. Antonio del Pollaiuolo signed both his papal tombs, though far less prominently than this.

The painting was originally painted for its current location of Sant' Agostino, but for a long time was in the Collegiata, the largest church in the city, until returned in the late 20th century. Saint Fina was buried in the Collegiata, which also has relics of Gimignano.

== Critical history ==
Perhaps because it was not in a major city, and because it is signed by Piero, traditionally regarded as the lesser artist, the painting has generally been less discussed than other major works by the Pollaiuolo brothers. Very hostile comments by Bernard Berenson in 1903 called it "a picture of unalloyed mediocrity, with scarcely a touch of charm to repay the absence of life and vigour"; this did not encourage detailed study by others. Frederick Hartt, an enthusiast for Antonio, remarked that "Piero... was a painter—a dull one, judging by his one signed work".

By contrast, Aldo Galli describes it as "a magnificent painting" that "presents ... close stylistic and technical affinities with" other works he attributes to Piero, and others have attributed to Antonio. "What they all have in common is a pronounced taste for precious effects, the highly efficacious imitation of jewels, brocades, velvets, with an illusionistic and tactile treatment based on the extensive and experimental use of oil-based binders (at the height of the reign of tempera in Florence), in open emulation of the Flemish masters". He describes the saints as "aristocratic" but "poised between ecstasy and migraine".

Charles Seymour Jr. compares it to the Primavera of Sandro Botticelli, "of virtually the same date", finding "Proto-Mannerism" in these and the slightly earlier sculpture of Mino da Fiesole.
