= Saint Sebastian (Botticelli) =

Painting by Sandro Botticelli

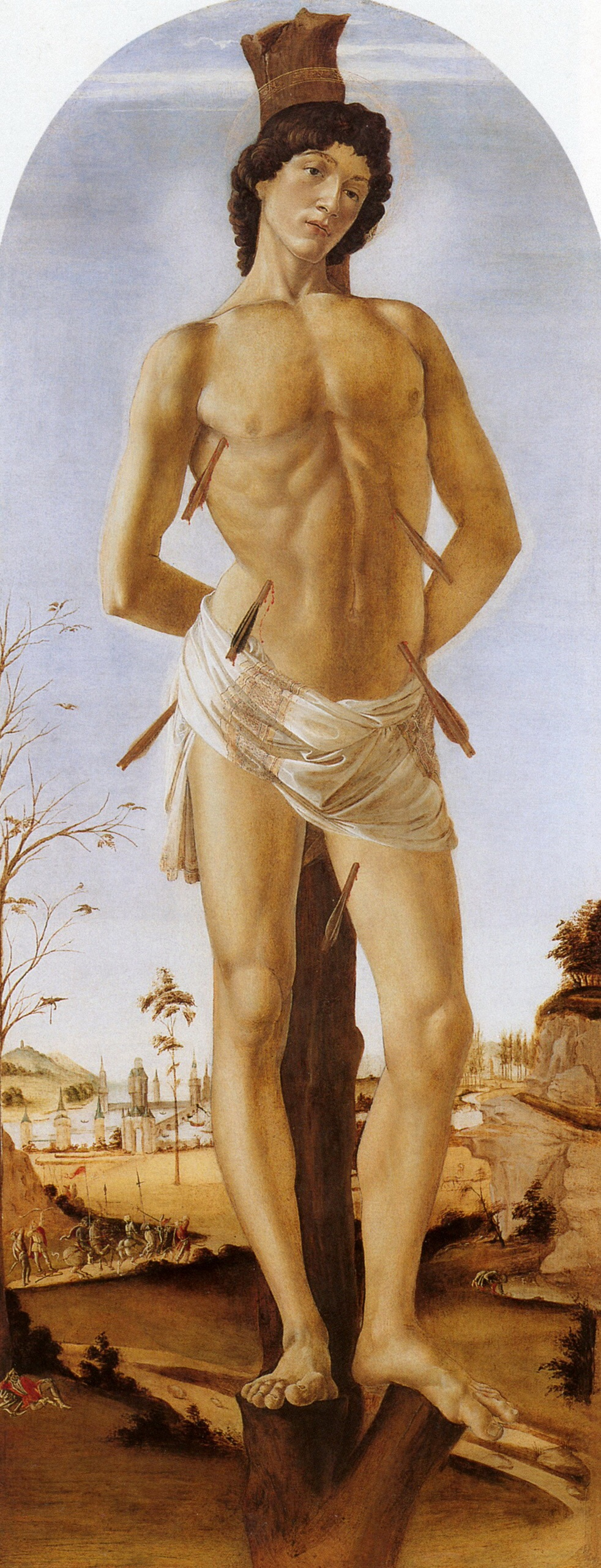
- Artist: Sandro Botticelli
- Year: 1474
- Medium: Tempera on panel
- Dimensions: 195 cm × 75 cm (77 in × 30 in)
- Location: Gemäldegalerie, Berlin

Saint Sebastian is a painting of the eponymous Christian saint by the Italian Renaissance painter Sandro Botticelli, executed before January 1474 when it was endowed to the church of Santa Maria Maggiore, Florence. Today the panel is housed in the Gemäldegalerie in Berlin.

== Criticism and influence ==
Kenneth Clark considered this picture remarkable for its closeness to the spirit of harmonious repose found in classical sculpture:

There are several reasons why for fifty years or more Donatello's David had no successors ... Another is the inherent restlessness of the Florentine temperament. Apollo is static. His gestures are dignified and calm. But the Florentines loved movement, the more violent the better. The two great masters of the nude in the late quattrocento, Pollaiuolo and Botticelli, are concerned with embodiments of energy or ecstatic motion, with a wrestling Hercules or a flying angel, and only once, in Botticelli's St. Sebastian, achieve a satisfactory nude in repose.

Rainer Maria Rilke's poem "Sankt Sebastian" (in Neue Gedichte, 1907) seems to have a close correspondence in description and mood to Botticelli's painting, as Rilke's translator J. B. Leishman and Jane Davidson Reid have observed.

== See also ==
- List of works by Sandro Botticelli
