= Apollo and Daphne (Pollaiuolo) =

Painting attributed to Piero del Pollaiuolo

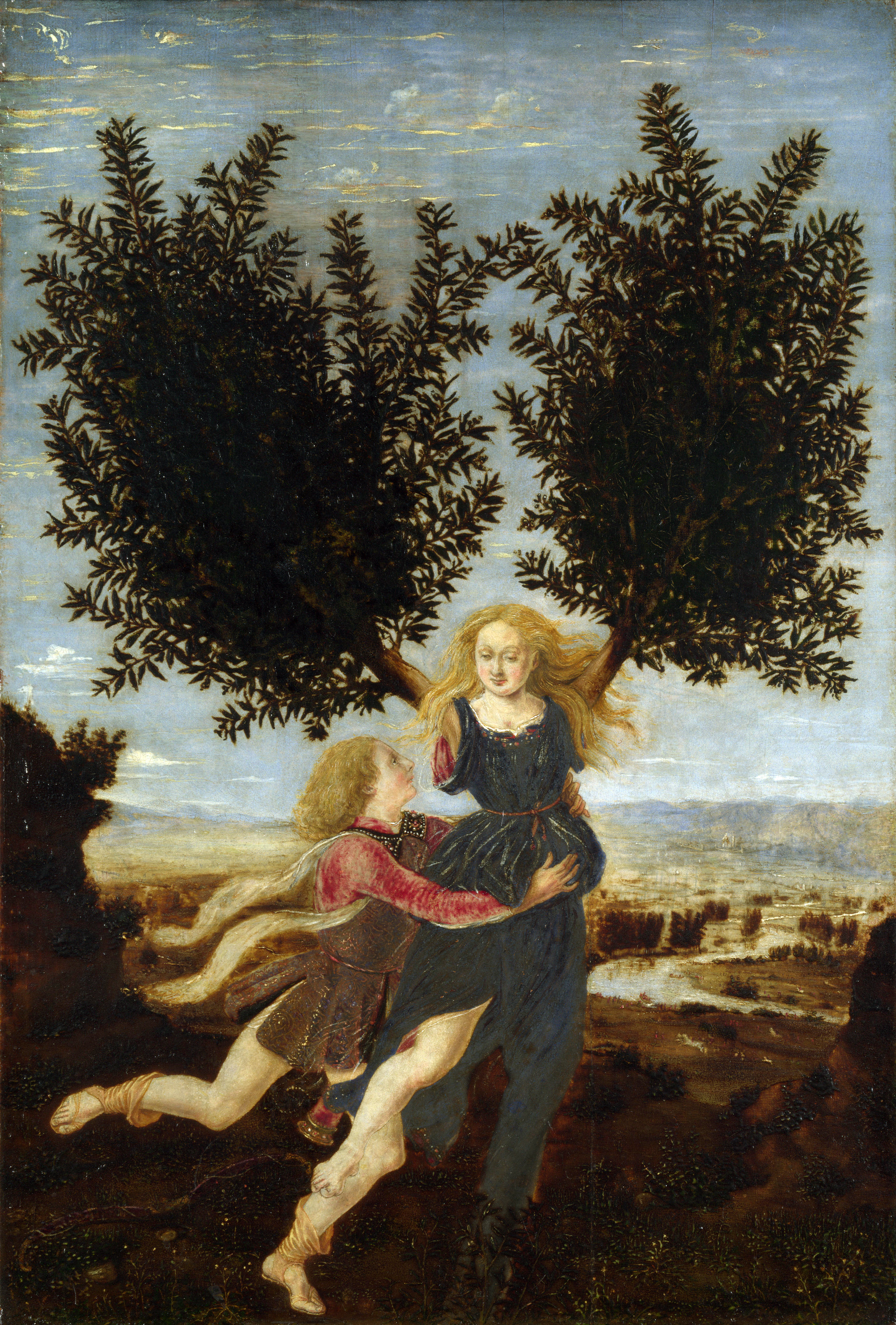
Apollo and Daphne (c. 1470–1480)

Apollo and Daphne is a c.1470–1480 oil on panel painting, attributed to Piero del Pollaiuolo (and/or his brother Antonio). William Coningham acquired it in Rome in 1845 and in 1876 Wynne Ellis left it to the National Gallery, London, where it still hangs. It shows Daphne's transformation into a laurel tree to escape Apollo in Ovid's Metamorphoses.

Its choice of wood as a support and its small dimensions mean that it was long mistaken as a fragment of a decorative cassone. It was long attributed to Antonio but is now usually attributed to Piero. The background vegetation was previously brighter but is now irreversibly oxidized.
