= Francesco Albertini =

Francesco Albertini (born in Florence in 1469 - died post 30 August 1510) was a canon of the Basilica of San Lorenzo in Florence and a chaplain of Cardinal Fazio Santoro in Rome. In 1510, he wrote three books: The Opusculum de mirabilibus novae & veteris urbis Romae, the Septem mirabilia orbis et urbis Romae et Florentinae and the Memoriale di molte picture e statue sono nella inclyta cipta di Florentia.

Opusculum de mirabilibus novae & veteris urbis Romae was "the most popular guide to Ancient Rome in the sixteenth century". Albertini presented it as the new and updated Mirabilia "shorn of its fables and nonsense", and included a substantial description of the reconstruction of Rome started by Pope Sixtus IV.

Memoriale di molte picture e statue sono nella inclyta cipta di Florentia is generally considered the first guidebook of Florence. According to Klein and Zerner, it is "a superficial and rather poor piece of writing" of dubious factual value, but it stands out as a monument of artistic spirit, pride and self-consciousness of Florentine people. However, De Boer shows that Albertini made few attributional mistakes and the book, albeit concise, is one of the most valuable sources about Florentine art prior to Giorgio Vasari's Lives of the Artists.

In the case of the brothers Antonio and Piero del Pollaiuolo, 21st-century art historians, led by Aldo Galli, are coming to prefer the attributions by Albertini of many paintings to Piero, rather than those by Vasari to Antonio. The Martyrdom of Saint Sebastian now in the National Gallery in London is a notable example.

== Sources ==
- Charles L. Stinger (1998). The Renaissance in Rome. Indiana University Press. ISBN 0-253-33491-8.
- Robert Klein, Henri Zerner (1989). Italian art, 1500-1600: sources and documents, Volume 1500. Northwestern University Press. ISBN 0-8101-0852-6.
- Waldemar H. de Boer (2010). Memorial of Many Statues and Paintings in the Illustrious City of Florence by Francesco Albertini (1510), edited by Michael W. Kwakkelstein. Centro Di. ISBN 978-88-7038-492-5.
