= Elevation of the Magdalen =

Painting by Antonio del Pollaiuolo

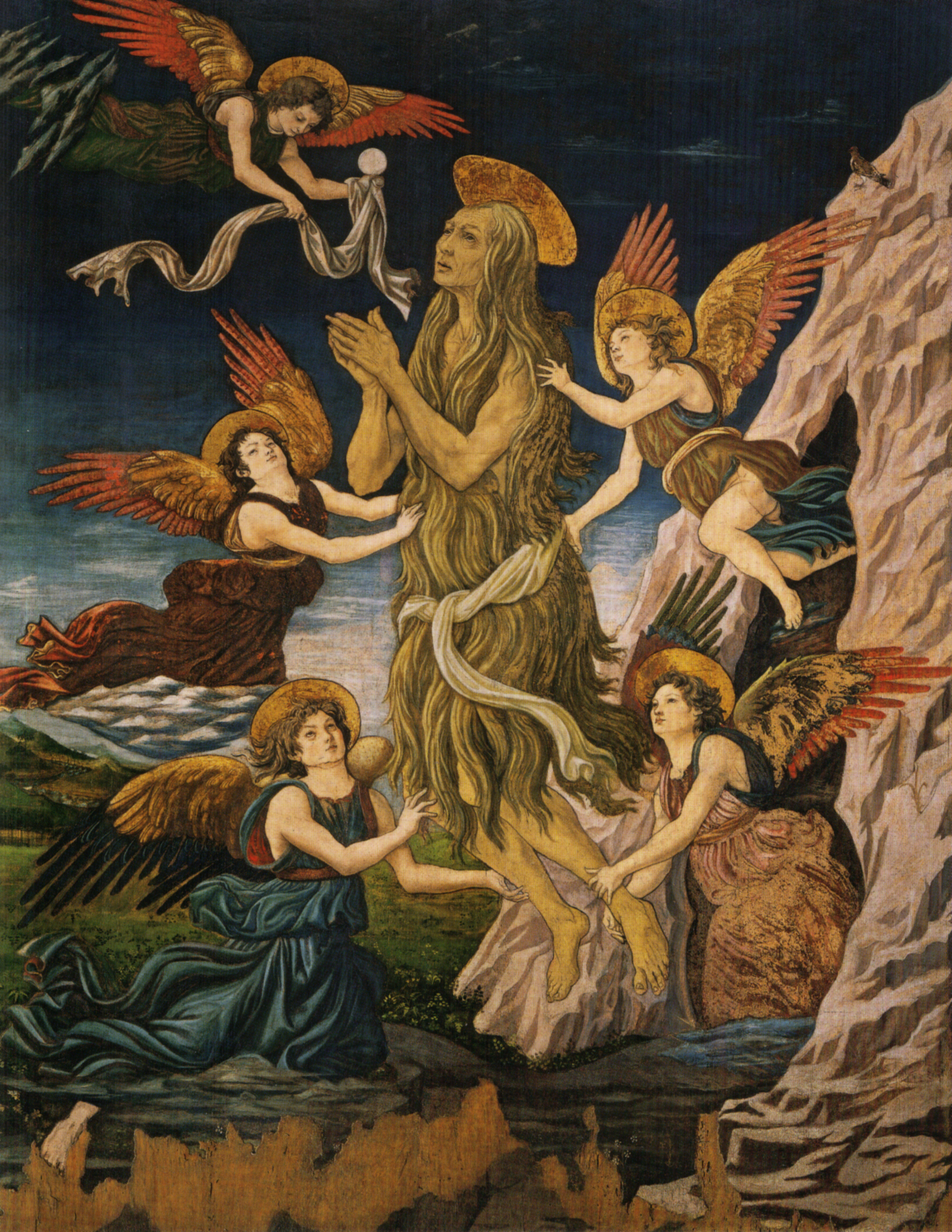
- Artist: Antonio del Pollaiuolo
- Year: c. 1460
- Medium: Oil and tempera on panel
- Dimensions: 209.5 cm × 166.2 cm (82.5 in × 65.4 in)
- Location: Museo della Pala del Pollaiolo, Staggia Senese

The Elevation of the Magdalen or Mystic Communion is a painting of c. 1460 by Antonio del Pollaiuolo in the Museo della Pala del Pollaiolo at Staggia Senese, now a district of the town of Poggibonsi in the Province of Siena, Italy. It shows Saint Mary Magdalene in penitence and prayer in the desert, supported by four angels and with a fifth bringing her a host.

The work was originally commissioned as an altarpiece for the parish church of Santa Maria Assunta in Staggia by Bindo Grazzini, a notary active in Florence but originally from Staggia. Grazzini was also a particular devotee of the Magdalen, to whom he dedicated a chapel in Staggia's parish church and a small hospital in his native area. Long lost, the panel was rediscovered in 1899 by Guido Carocci and six years later was published by Bernard Berenson.
