= Antonio del Pollaiuolo =

Italian painter, sculptor, and engraver (d. 1498)

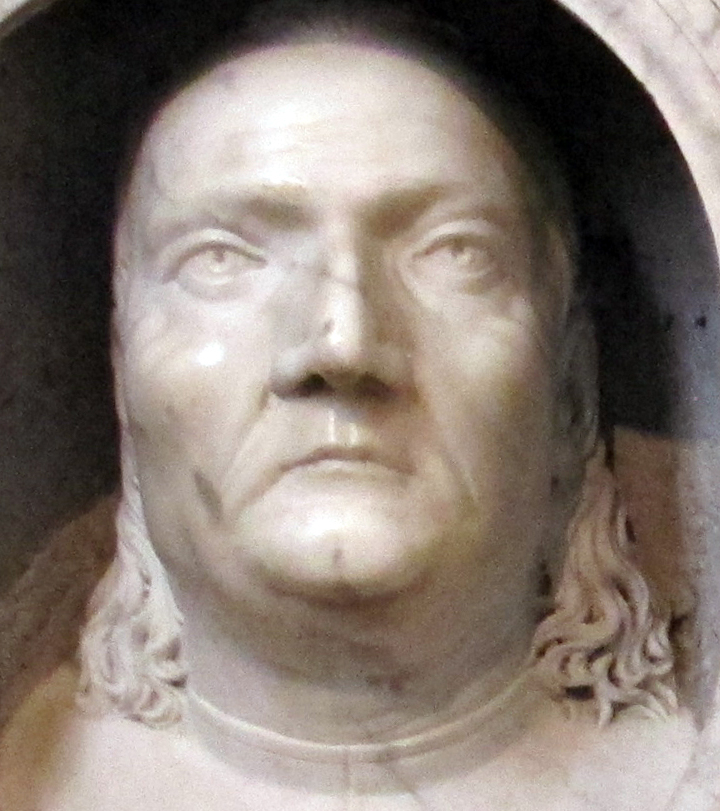
- Antonio del Pollaiuolo, detail of his tomb
- Born: c. 17 January 1429 or 1433; Florence, Republic of Florence
- Died: 4 February 1498 (aged 69); Rome, Papal States
- Known for: Italian Renaissance painting, sculpture, engraving, goldsmithing
- Notable work: Battle of the Nudes, tombs of Pope Sixtus IV and Innocent VIII

Antonio del Pollaiuolo (UK: /ˌpɒlaɪˈwoʊloʊ/ POL-eye-WOH-loh, US: /ˌpoʊl-/ POHL-, Italian: [anˈtɔːnjo del pollaˈjwɔːlo]; 17 January 1429/1433 – 4 February 1498), also known as Antonio di Jacopo Pollaiuolo or Antonio Pollaiuolo (also spelled Pollaiolo), was an Italian Renaissance painter, sculptor, engraver, and goldsmith, who made important works in all these media, as well as designing works in others, for example vestments, metal embroidery being a medium he worked in at the start of his career.

His most characteristic works in his main media show largely naked male figures in complicated poses of violent action, drawing from classical examples and often centred on a heroic Hercules. He, or possibly his brother, was also an innovative painter of wide landscape backgrounds, perhaps having learnt from Early Netherlandish painting. His two papal tombs were the only monuments to survive the demolition of Old St Peter's in the next century and be reconstructed in the present St Peter's Basilica.

He very often worked in collaboration with his younger brother Piero del Pollaiuolo (c. 1443–1496), and distinguishing their contributions to satisfy modern ideas of authorship has proved exceptionally difficult, so that many paintings are just described as by the Pollaiuolo brothers. Contemporaries, and Giorgio Vasari, saw Antonio as by far the more talented, and responsible for the design and main painting of most works, but in recent decades the reputation of Piero has strengthened somewhat, and he is now given sole authorship of, for example, the small Apollo and Daphne (1470–1480) by its owner, the National Gallery. At the same time, contemporary references in lists of leading artists, of which there are a number, mostly mention the brothers together, and Vasari's Lives of the Artists treats them in a single life.

According to Kenneth Clark, two factors have reduced his prominence in the modern view of Quattrocento art: the loss of his large paintings of the labours of Hercules (surviving only in miniature copies), and "a name which looks difficult to pronounce". In his own day, and for several decades later, his "true position" as "one of the originating forces in the history of European art" was recognised.

== Biography ==
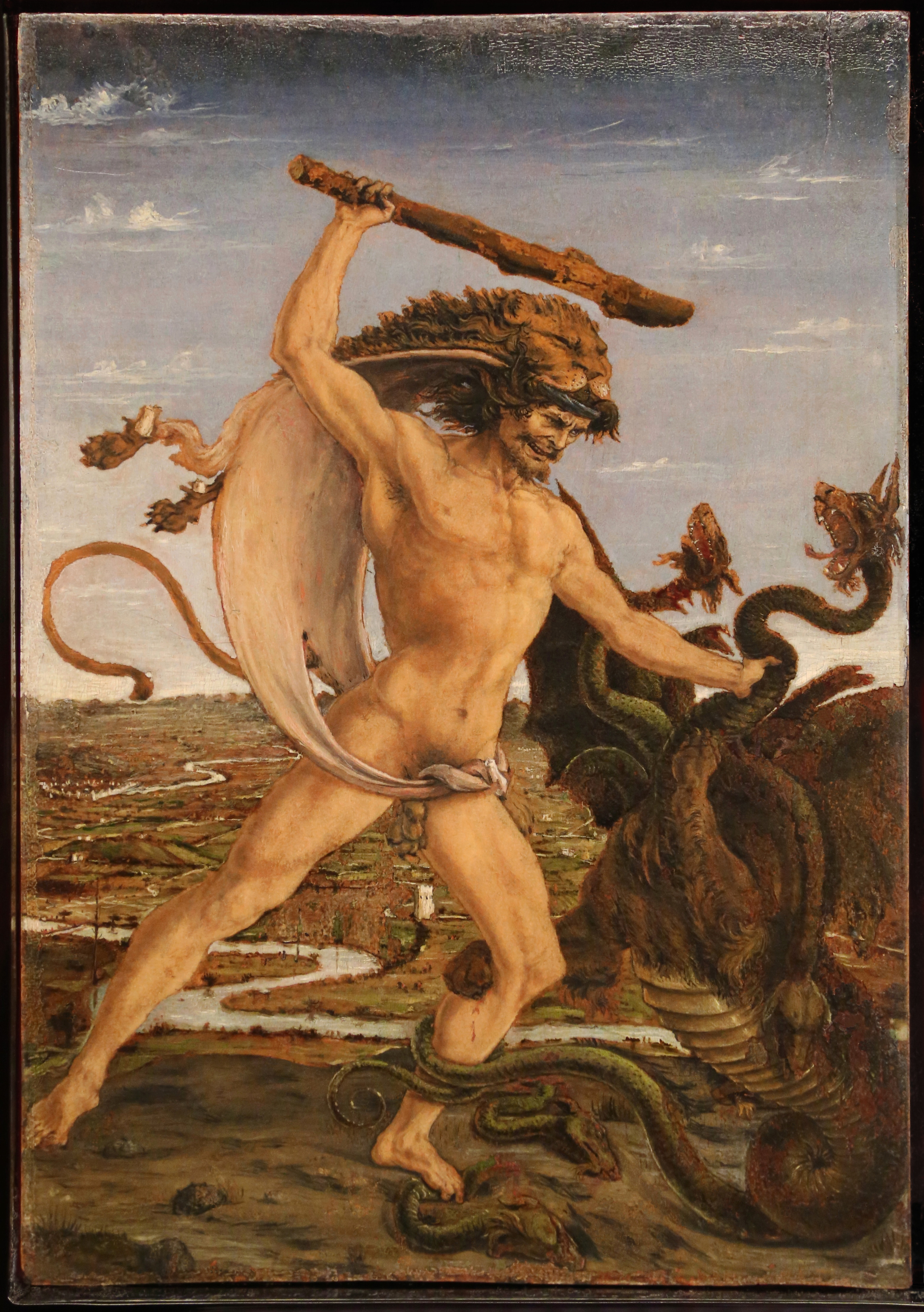
Hercules and the Hydra, a reduced version of his huge painting for the Medici Palace, now lost (Uffizi)

He was born in Florence. The brothers took the nickname pollaiuolo meaning "poulterer" in Italian from the trade of their father Jacopo, who sold poultry, pollaio. This was a luxury trade at the time, and Jacopo's four sons were unlikely all to find room for careers in it. According to Benedetto Dei, the contemporary "fanatical enumerator" of Florentine life, there were only 8 poultry suppliers in Florence in 1472, but 44 goldsmith's workshops.

Antonio was the eldest son; the two middle brothers respectively went into poultry (eventually inheriting that business) and goldsmithing. The youngest brother, Piero, was also an artist, apparently only in painting, and he and Antonio very frequently worked together, though their workshops were physically "separate but mutually accessible". Their work shows both classical influences and an interest in human anatomy; reportedly, the brothers carried out dissections to improve their knowledge of the subject. If so, these would be "among the early Renaissance forays into anatomical research".

Antonio's first trade was goldsmithing and metalworking. Although documentation is probably missing, the statements of many near-contemporaries that he trained in the large workshop of Lorenzo Ghiberti may well be correct. This is not contradicted by the possibility that he was the "Antonio di Jacopo" listed in 1457 as a "lavorante" for Miliani Dei, twin brother of the chronicler and from a long-established goldsmithing family.

Vasari, whose account of the brothers' "early training contains a number of implausibilities", says that having decided to move from goldsmithing to painting, his brother gave him his first lessons. Piero was about ten years younger but had trained as a painter from the start. However, this seems unlikely; Andrea del Castagno was a great influence on him, and he may have trained with him, as Piero may have done, or possibly Domenico Veneziano.

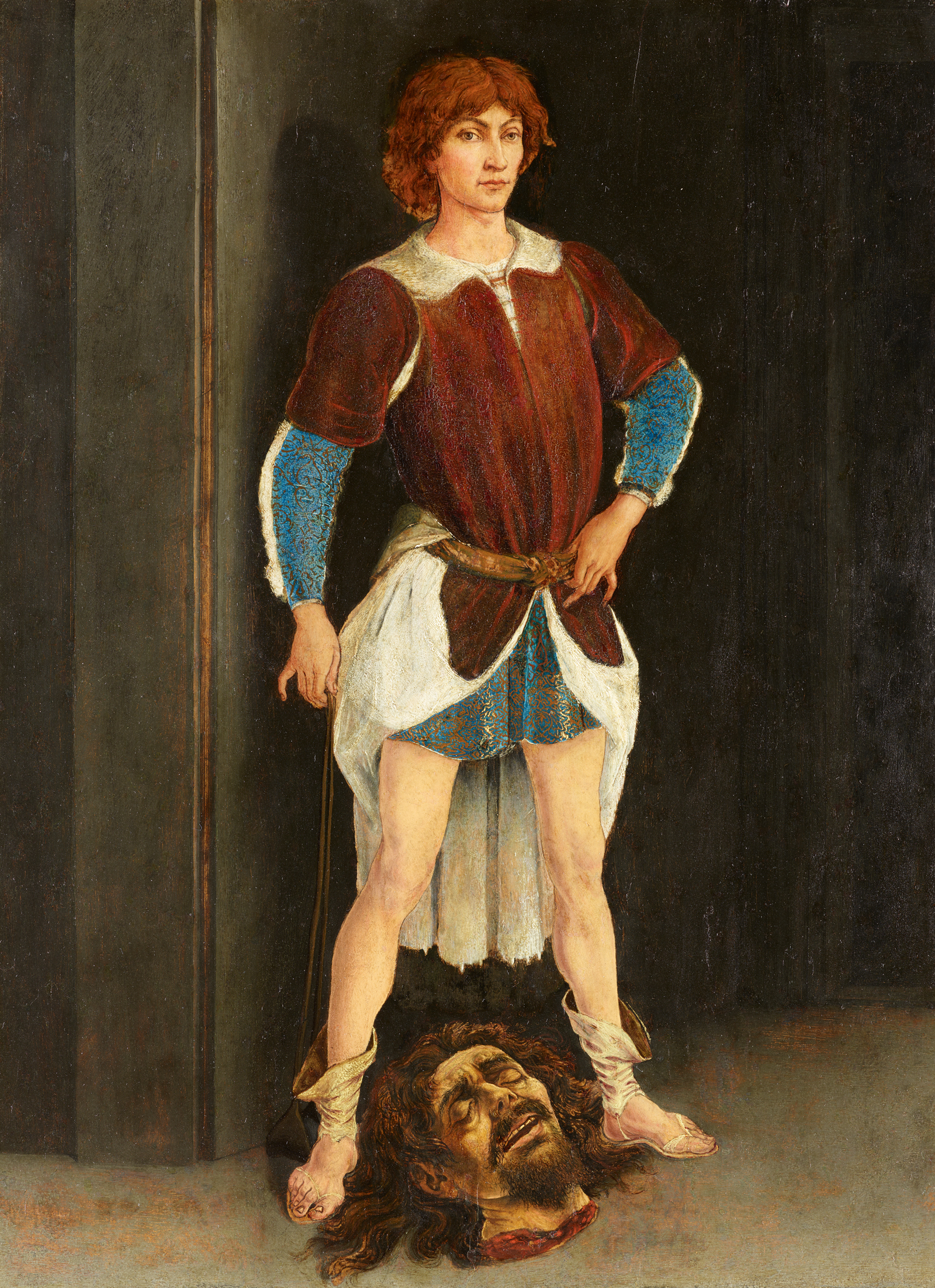
David with the Head of Goliath, by both brothers (c. 1470)

By 1459 Antonio had his own workshop, as a goldsmith and painter, with his practice in sculpture and engraving developing later. In 1464 he signed a lease for well-located premises, on the Via Vaccherrechia opposite the Palazzo Vecchio. They had been previously used by another goldsmith, and so were arranged appropriately; the lease was periodically renewed up to 1493. In the following years apprentices were taken on.

He entered the silk-workers guild in 1466 and married his first wife (eighteen years old) in 1469, with a dowry of over 500 gold florins. That year he began to buy land in the country. in 1472 the two brothers and their father bought a house near their family home in the city, dividing it into three units, apparently for renting.

For over twenty years he had a successful career in Florence, rarely leaving the territory of the Republic of Florence, and by 1489 was described by Jacopo Lanfredini as the best artist in the city (this praise is often wrongly attributed to Lorenzo de' Medici). But by then a commission for a papal tomb, that of Pope Sixtus IV, St. Peter's, had taken him to Rome in 1484, or perhaps a little earlier. Thereafter both brothers seem to have spent most of their time in Rome, but returning to Florence at times.

By the time he had finished the first tomb, in 1493, the next pope had died, and he stayed in Rome to do his tomb as well. After a last visit to Florence in 1496, to put the finishing touches to the work already begun in the sacristy of Santo Spirito, he died in Rome in 1498 as a rich man, having just finished his tomb of Pope Innocent VIII, also in St. Peter's. He was buried in the church of San Pietro in Vincoli, where a joint monument was raised to him and his brother, who had died in Rome two years earlier.

His departure for Rome meant that in his last years he avoided the depressing collapse of the Florentine "Golden Age" following the death of Lorenzo de' Medici in 1492, the occupation by the French in 1494, followed by the brief leadership of Savonarola and continued political instability and military threats.

He had two daughters but no son, though a nephew (b. 1472) worked with him – he is last heard of being rejected by Michelangelo for work on the Tomb of Pope Julius II in 1507. There was some litigation in Florence over the assets Antonio left, in which his widow gave evidence in 1511.

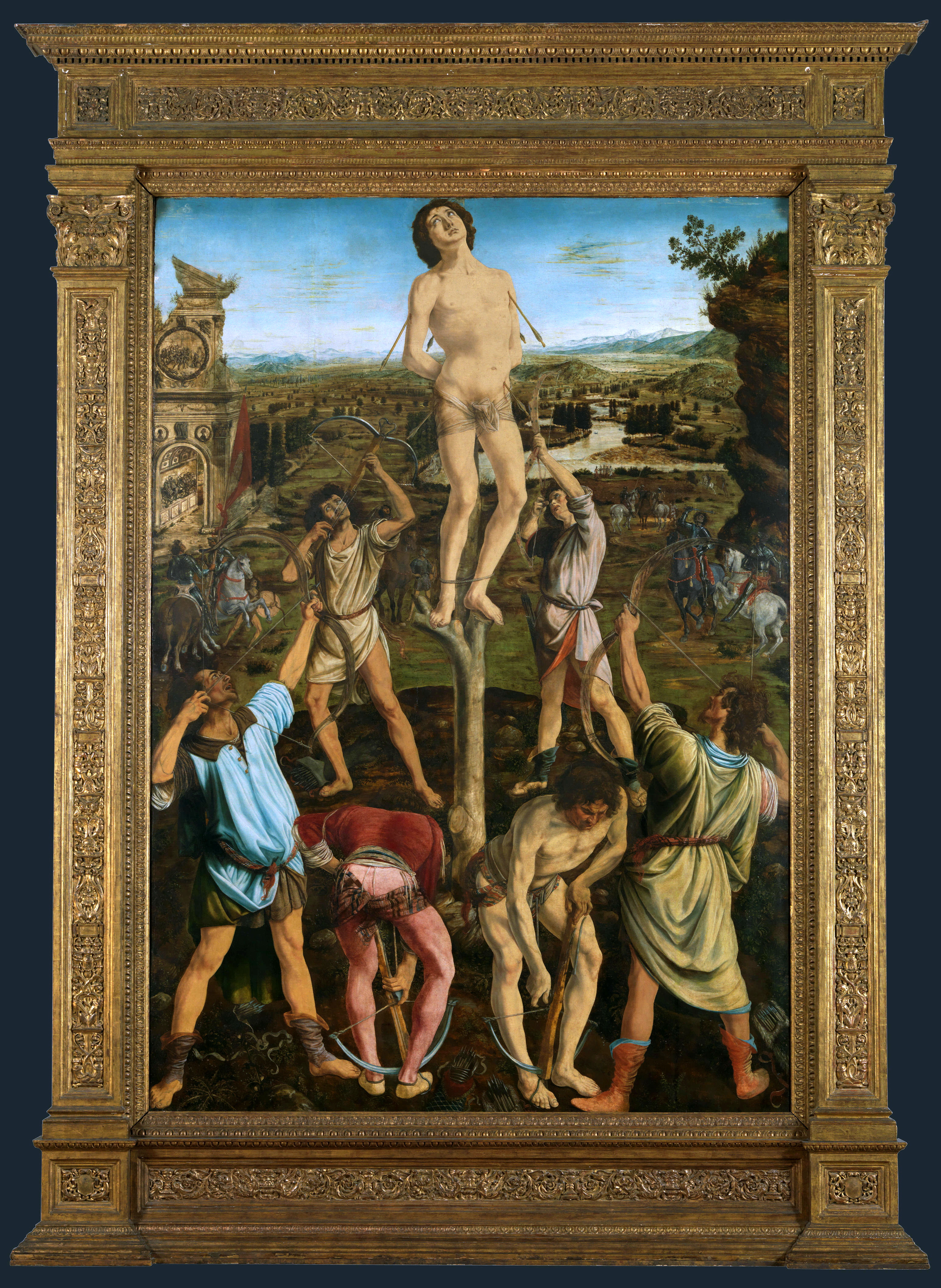
Martyrdom of Saint Sebastian (1473–1475), with his brother Piero

== Redistribution of paintings between the brothers ==
In recent years there has been a trend among art historians to increase the credit Piero is given for the paintings, led by Aldo Galli, whose Antonio and Piero Del Pollaiuolo: Silver and Gold, Painting and Bronze (2014) assigns the actual painting of many works to Piero that had long been given to Antonio, or both brothers. Galli only attributes to Antonio the reduced versions of the two Labours of Hercules (Uffizi), the Dancing Nudes fresco, and an early altarpiece with the Elevation of the Magdalen. At least one of the brothers was influenced by the landscape style of Early Netherlandish painting, and the revisionist school thinks that this was Piero. Attributions of works of sculpture and other media are unaffected.

Vasari began the tradition of stressing the contribution of Antonio rather than Piero to the paintings, which went largely unchallenged until the 20th century, despite suspicions by art historians such as Martin Davies, Director of the National Gallery. In the 21st century a full and partly successful challenge has been mounted, and some attributions changed by owning museums. This article gives the traditional attributions, or follows the owning museums, sometimes noting changes in recent years.

== Painting ==
The dating of his work (before he went to Rome) is mostly uncertain, and much of his painting, especially of larger pieces, was apparently done together with his brother. A group of paintings are generally agreed to be relatively early, before about 1466. Contemporaries valued Antonio's work far above that of Piero, especially in respect of its disegno or drawing, for which Antonio was perhaps generally responsible.

He was early as a significant painter depicting subjects from classical mythology, especially those featuring Hercules, but the surviving examples of these are small paintings for private houses. Both his scriptural and mythological paintings excel in depicting action, with a "fierce air" that was unusual for the period. Such subjects had previously been painted at a similar scale for cassone chests, but Pollaiuolo's seem always to have been intended as framed images.

His Hercules and the Hydra (c. 1475) and Hercules and Antaeus (c. 1478), both now in the Uffizi, are apparently miniature versions of two out of three very large paintings of the Labours of Hercules that he did for the Sala Grande of the Medici Palace, a large room designed to impress visitors. These were 6 braccia square or high—about 3.5 metres (11 ft), on cloth, so with over-life size figures; Hercules and the Nemean lion was the third. For some fifty years after their completion, these "were amongst the most famous and influential works of their time", but are now lost, "like nearly every canvas of the date".

These were done around 1460, very early in his independent career, and must have loudly announced his arrival as a painter to Florence and beyond. They were perhaps commissioned by Piero di Cosimo de' Medici rather than his father, and were on cloth, still relatively unusual in Florence at this date.

Another early painting, from about 1470, is his David with the Head of Goliath, now in Berlin. Unlike the most famous Davids of the period, by Donatello (in both marble and bronze), Verrocchio, or Michelangelo, this lacks any documentary evidence linking it to the Florentine government or the Medici family. David is fully and rather richly dressed, with ermine linings, and appears more as a patrician Florentine than a young shepherd. At 46.2 × 34 cm (18.1 × 13.3 in) it was presumably intended for a domestic setting.

The composition of a banner, documented but now lost, of the Archangel Michael in combat with the devil in the form of a dragon or serpent, is known from a copy, and is enthusiastically described by Vasari. It was done for a confraternity in Arezzo, the biographer's home town.

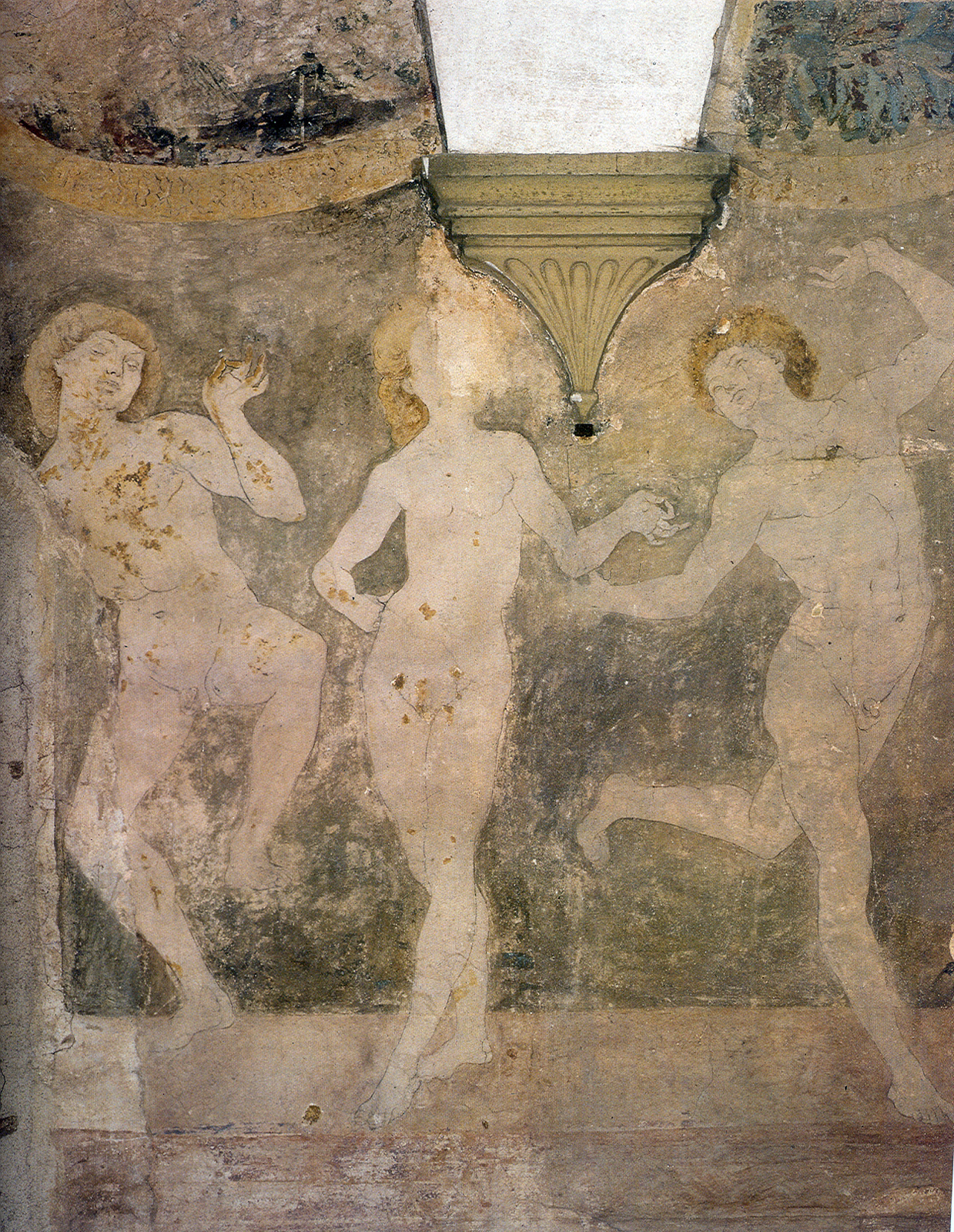
Damaged fresco of dancing figures, 1470s, Villa la Gallina

His Martyrdom of Saint Sebastian, done with his brother, but probably drawn by Antonio, was painted in 1473–1475 for the Pucci Chapel of the SS. Annunziata. It is his largest and most ambitious surviving work, "a milestone in Renaissance art", as the first large scale painting where the composition is dictated by the actions of the figures. The six large foreground figures of soldiers are paired in three poses, but seen from different angles. This has the largest of the sweeping landscape backgrounds, with a river winding through, that feature in several paintings.

A fresco frieze of dancing nude figures, in a villa near Florence, perhaps from the 1470s, is in very poor condition, but shows the same interest in extreme body poses as works mentioned above, but this time in a spirit of joy. This was for the Lanfredini family, close allies of the Medici who seem to have been important early patrons of Antonio, willing to put pressure on others to get payments due to him.

There are a number of rather similar head and shoulders portraits in profile of youngish women attributed to one of the brothers, or their workshop.

He often used an unorthodox technique in his panel paintings, applying paint directly to the wood, without the usual ground of gesso. This may be responsible for the paint losses some panels have suffered. His main contribution to Florentine painting lay in his analysis of the human body in movement or under conditions of strain, but he is also important for his pioneering skill interest in depicting wide landscape backgrounds.

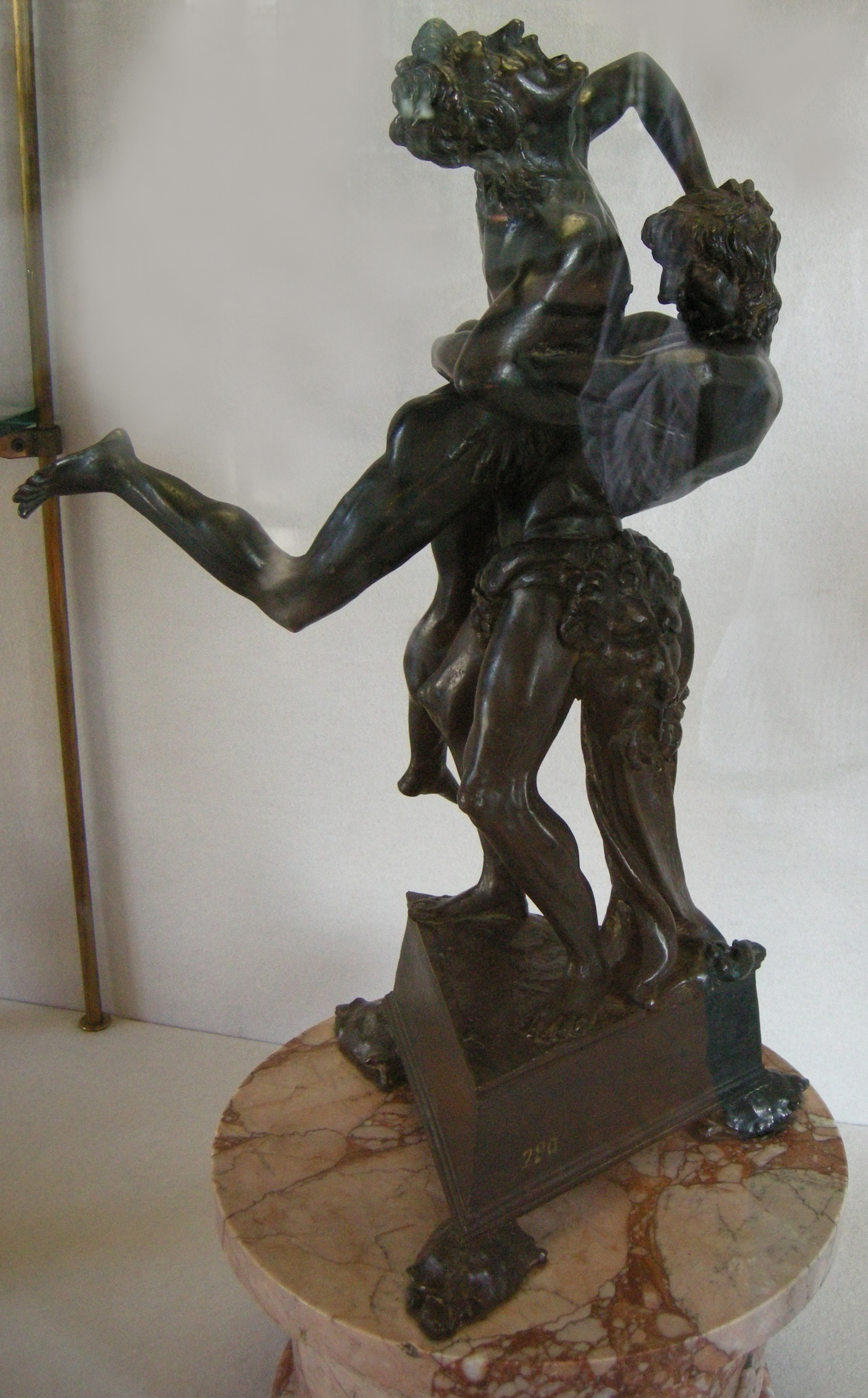
Hercules and Antaeus, bronze, Bargello

== Sculpture ==
Artists who were both painters and sculptors were not very uncommon in 15th-century Italy; Andrea del Verrocchio is a near-contemporary example in Florence, with a similar career pattern, beginning as a goldsmith, then working for the Medici and finally leaving the city in 1483. The Florentine guilds were more flexible in this respect than those in many cities.

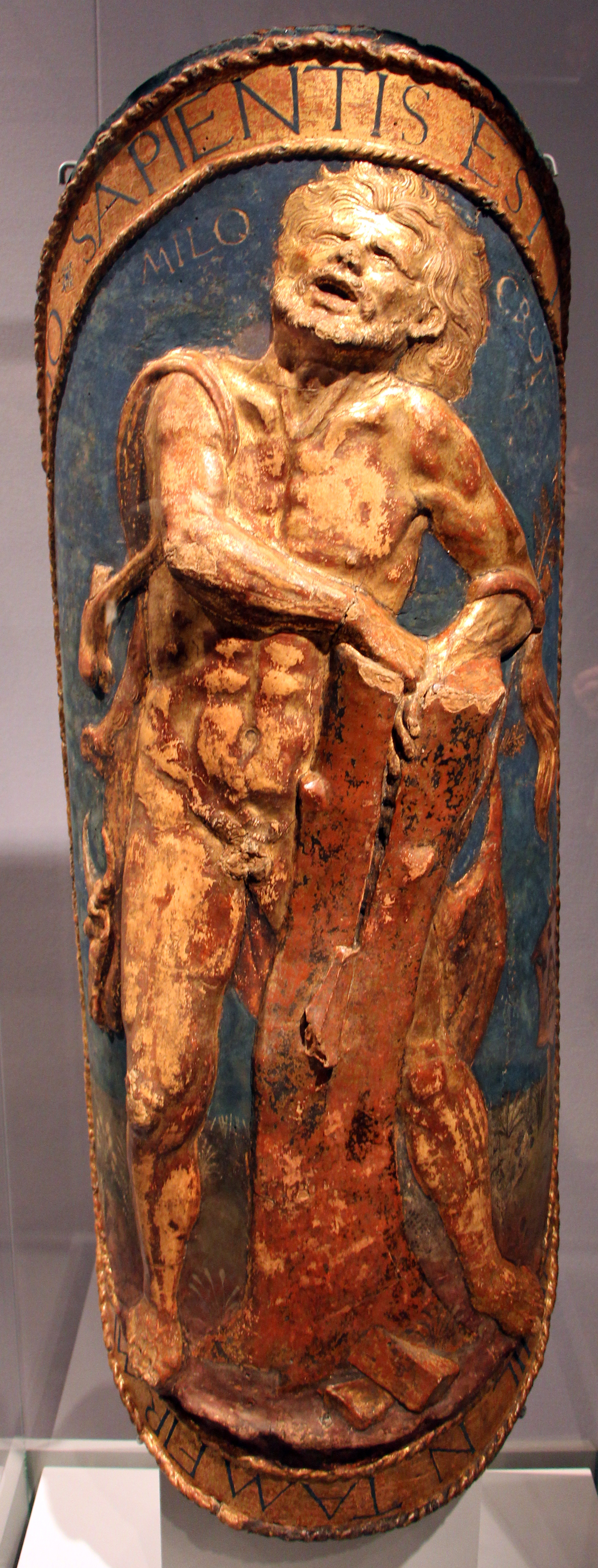
Parade shield with plaster Milo of Croton, c. 1460–1465, Louvre, Paris

His brother Piero was not a sculptor, removing the issues over attribution that affect the paintings. As a sculptor Antonio and his workshop worked in bronze, silver, terracotta, plaster and wood, but apparently never in stone. Both his papal tombs have bronze effigies, and a very important early commission was the lower parts of a silver crucifix for the main altar of the Florence Baptistery, and later reliefs for the altar. He also produced a large crucifix with the corpus in painted cork, and a parade shield with a relief of Milo of Croton in gilded plaster (Louvre).

A stucco relief with over-life size figures of Hercules and Cacus in combat on a wall in the courtyard of the Palazzo Guicciardini in Florence was first published as by a follower of Antonio, a derivation of a design by him, and "since that time extremely few scholars have shown any interest in it"; Aldo Galli and some others believe it to be an original work by Antonio, of about 1465.

He was one of the sculptors who developed the genre of the "table bronze" or small bronze figure for the palaces of the rich. At least three of his were of Hercules, who also figures in several of his paintings. Two small Hercules bronzes, now in the Bode Museum in Berlin and the Frick Collection in New York, show the hero standing in a resting pose, but another shows the fight between Hercules and Antaeus and "broke all the rules of sculpture" in allowing "the liberty of the figures to move in any direction necessitated by their actions". This belonged to the Medici family in the 15th century.

Two surviving drawings, one owned and described by Vasari, record his involvement in the long planned by never realized project for an equestrian statue in bronze, as a memorial to Francesco Sforza, Duke of Milan (d. 1466). First his widow, then his son and nephew, successors to his dukedom talked to various sculptors before finally commissioning Leonardo da Vinci in the 1480s. Only a huge clay maquette was ever realized before the French invasion of 1494, during a later phase of which French troops destroyed it.

=== Goldsmithing ===
Goldsmith work was probably his "primary activity" through most of his career, and perhaps its most profitable aspect, but apart from major church commissions almost nothing clearly attributable has survived, except for the Baptistery crucifix and plaques. This is normal, as secular pieces, and many smaller ones for churches, were nearly always recycled for bullion or remaking over the next few centuries. Because of their value, many lost pieces are documented, in contrast to his smaller paintings, almost all without contemporary documentation.

Large secular commissions, now vanished, include some for the government: in 1472 a ceremonial silver bowl weighing 32 pounds (15 kg), with a relief "garland of children" inside, and in 1472–1473 an ornamental "display helmet", silver-gilt with enamels, and topped with a figure of Hercules. This was for presentation to the condottiero Federigo da Montefeltro, Duke of Urbino, who the Florentines had hired, and the evidence suggests that Antonio delivered it to Urbino himself. In 1480 the Signoria commissioned a silver washbowl.

In 1476 he made the enamelled handle and sheath for a "bread knife", for a well-off citizen, and there would have been many small commissions for jewellery, table plate and small fittings. He made the silver-gilt fittings, with enamel roundels, for the treasure binding of the "Paris Petrarch", a collection of works by Petrarch commissioned by Lorenzo de' Medici in 1476 (now in Paris, after passing to Charles VIII of France). The damaged enamel roundels show the Muses playing instruments.

=== Papal tombs ===
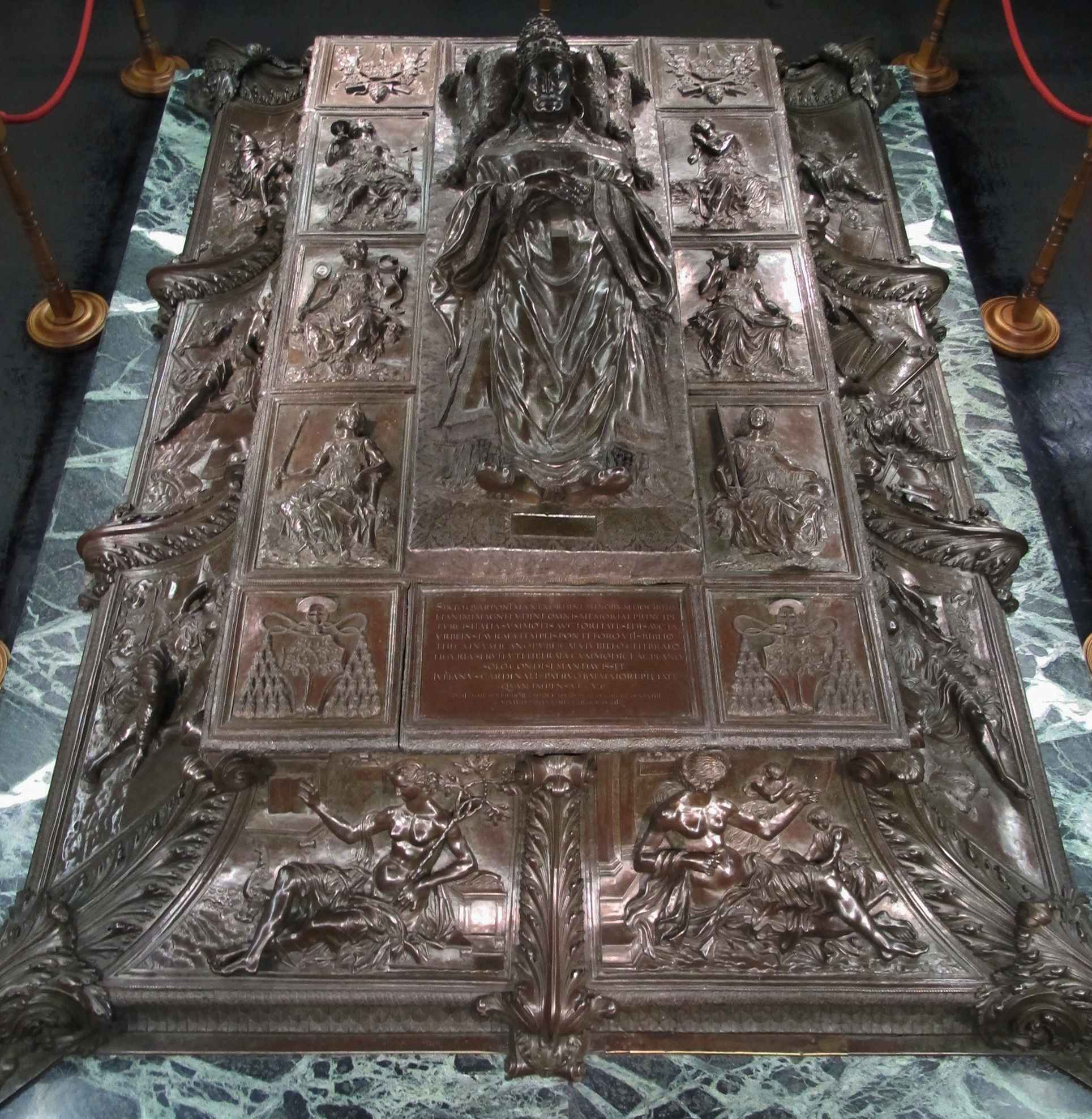
Tomb of Pope Sixtus IV, completed 1493

Remarkably, the two Pollaiuolo tombs were the only papal monuments to survive the demolition of Old St Peter's in the next century and be reconstructed in the present St Peter's Basilica; Vasari complained of Bramante's disregard for preserving other monuments. This must be partly due to Pollaiuolo's reputation and the quality of his work, but both tombs were also unusual and innovative.

Pope Sixtus IV had begun planning for his floor tomb before his death in 1484, including the construction of a new side chapel near the main altar. When the new basilica was built in the next century, it was relocated to the undercroft, perhaps because it took up so much floor space. A recumbent effigy in bronze, unsparing in showing an aged person, and using a death mask, was surrounded by flat low reliefs, with personifications of the "Theological and Cardinal Virtues", and then larger high relief figures of the Liberal Arts on a sloping zone leading to the base, which was originally of green marble. These are highly classicising, though "of varying quality, betraying some collaboration." The arts include "Perspective", holding an astrolabe and an oak branch for Sixtus's Della Rovere family.

The inscriptions include: Opus Antoni Polaioli / Florentini Arg. Auro. / Pict. Aere Clari / An. Do. MCCCCLXXXXIII", "The work of Antonio Pollaiuolo of Florence, famous in silver, gold, painting and bronze, AD 1493".

His second papal tomb, for Pope Innocent VIII, has two bronze effigies, one showing the pope lying dead, and the other showing him enthroned and making a blessing gesture. This was the first pope shown as living on his tomb, though pairs of living and dead figures had been used for other tombs. A figure shown in life was to become very common in later papal tombs. Originally the live figure was the lower, but in 1606 a rearrangement reversed their positions. The live figure holds a representation of the relic of the Holy Lance that the Turkish Sultan had given the papacy during Innocent's reign. This, his last work, originally included a self-portrait, now lost, probably in profile.

== Engraving ==
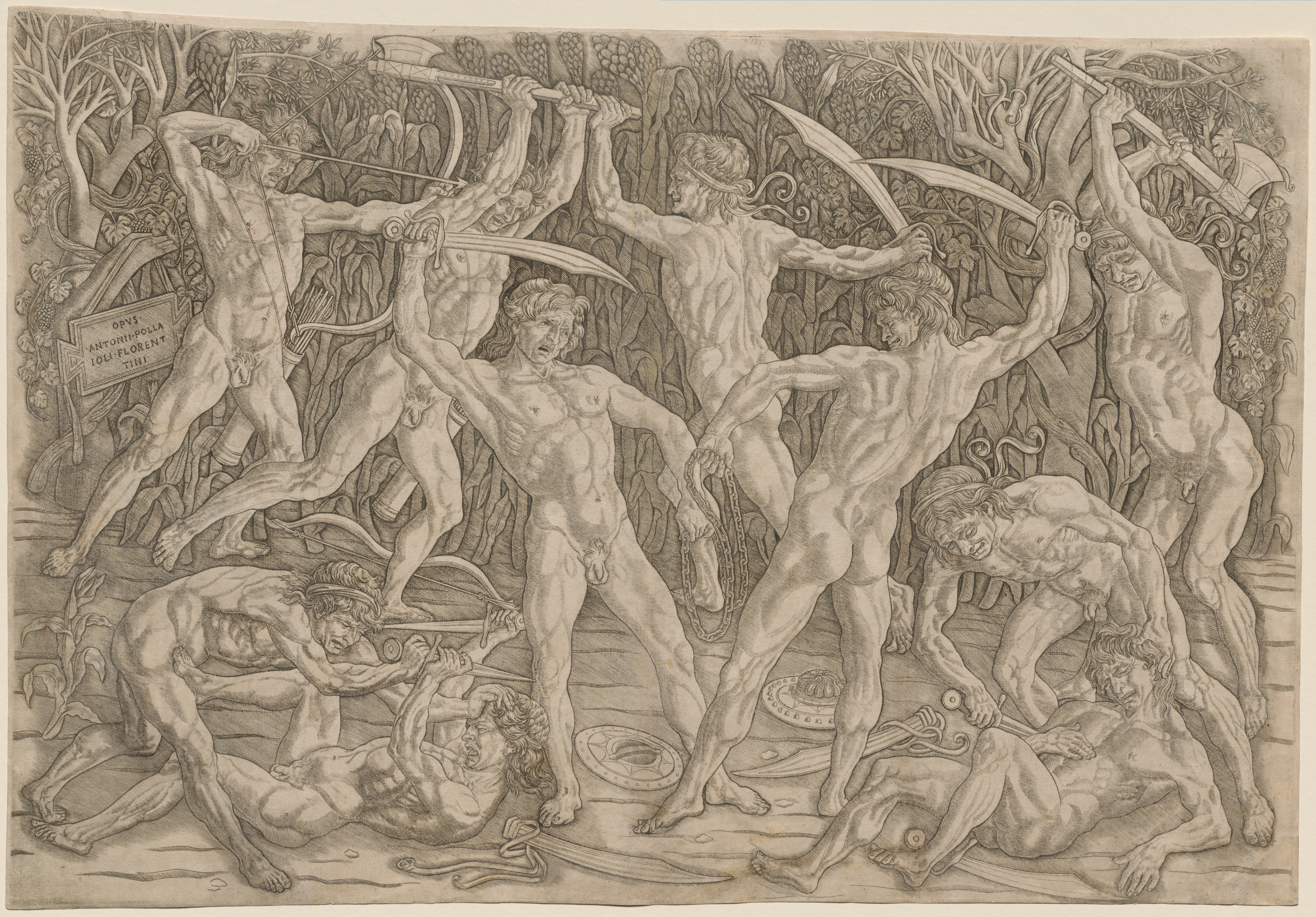
Battle of the Nude Men (1470s?) – Engraving, 42.8 × 61.8 cm

He only produced one surviving engraving, the Battle of the Nude Men, but both in its size and sophistication this took the Italian print to new levels, and remains one of the most famous prints of the Renaissance. He produced a terracotta relief with a different composition of such a battle; both are mentioned by Vasari, who says he made other engravings, but may have been confused by copies or versions by others.

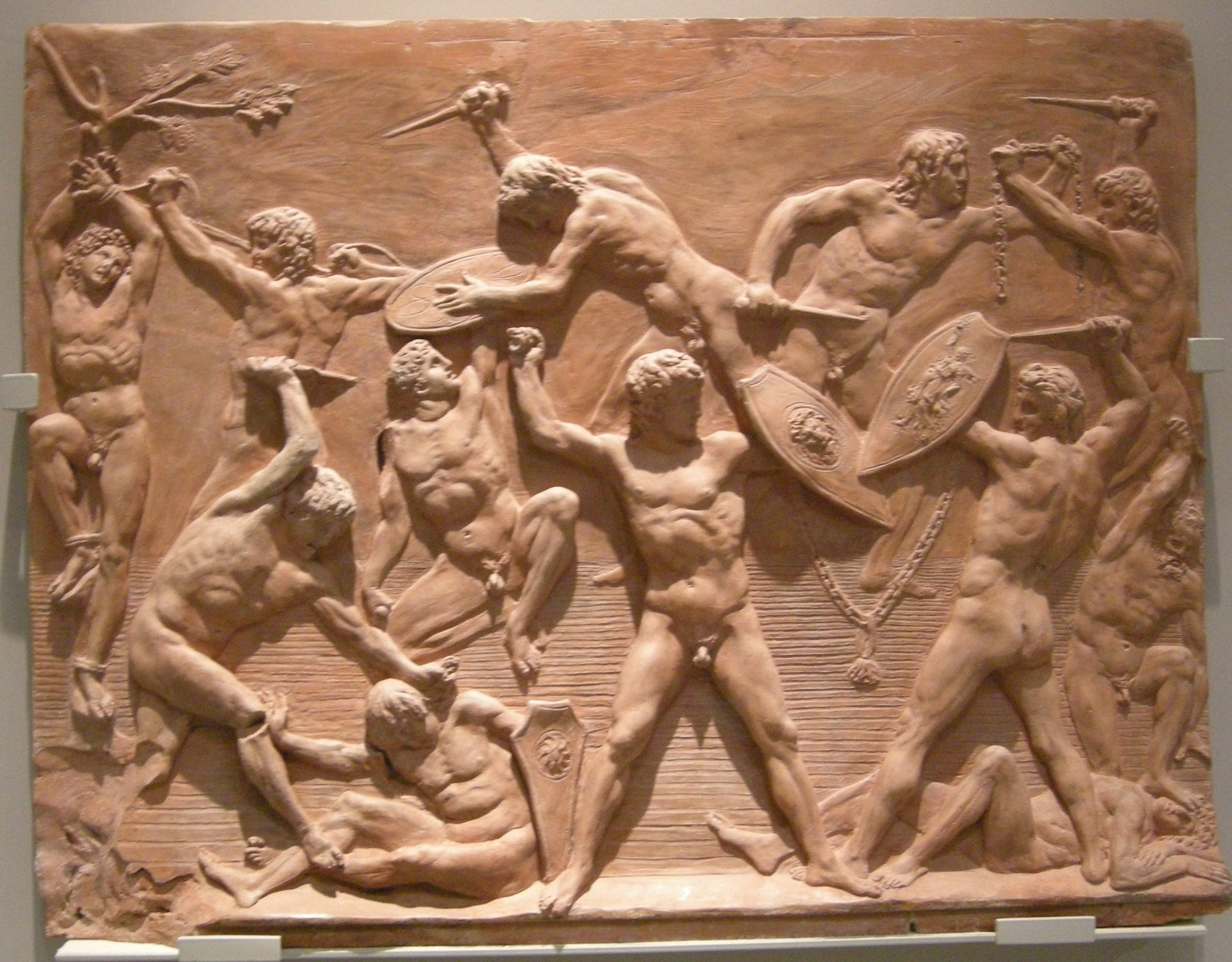
Terracotta relief with another Battle of the Nude Men, 1470s

== Other work ==
He designed a set of vestments for the Florence Baptistery in the 1460s, a prestigious commission, with the work being done by specialists. He was still being paid for design work on these in 1480.

His drawings are praised by 15th-century writers, and apparently collected and used as models by other artists. Later, Vasari says he owned some, including designs for an equestrian statue; such a drawing survives in Berlin. Drawings now attributed to his own hand are fewer than they used to be; probably fewer than twenty. Some of these are figure studies, others narrative scenes, and there are two designs, on either side of the same sheet for church metalwork pieces that have not survived. This sheet is actually signed on both sides, it appears by Antonio himself, with "Antonio Pollaiuolo horafo".

== Signed and dated works ==
Antonio neither signed nor dated his paintings; in contrast Piero signed one altarpiece. However, Antonio did include his inscribed name on both his papal tombs, as well as on his single engraving. In these works he was (as was typical at the period) keen to include his "nationality" as a citizen of the Republic of Florence, and sometimes to stress his other skills beyond sculpture.

The engraving is signed: OPVS ANTONII POLLAIOLI FLORENTINI ("the work of Antonio Pollaiuolo the Florentine") on a tablet at left. Signing a print so prominently was unusual at this period. The main inscription on the tomb of Pope Sixtus IV is given above; there are two shorter ones in other parts of the monument: ANTONIUS POLLAIOLUS FLORENTINUS and OPUS ANTONII DE FLORENTIA.

== Major works ==
=== Paintings ===
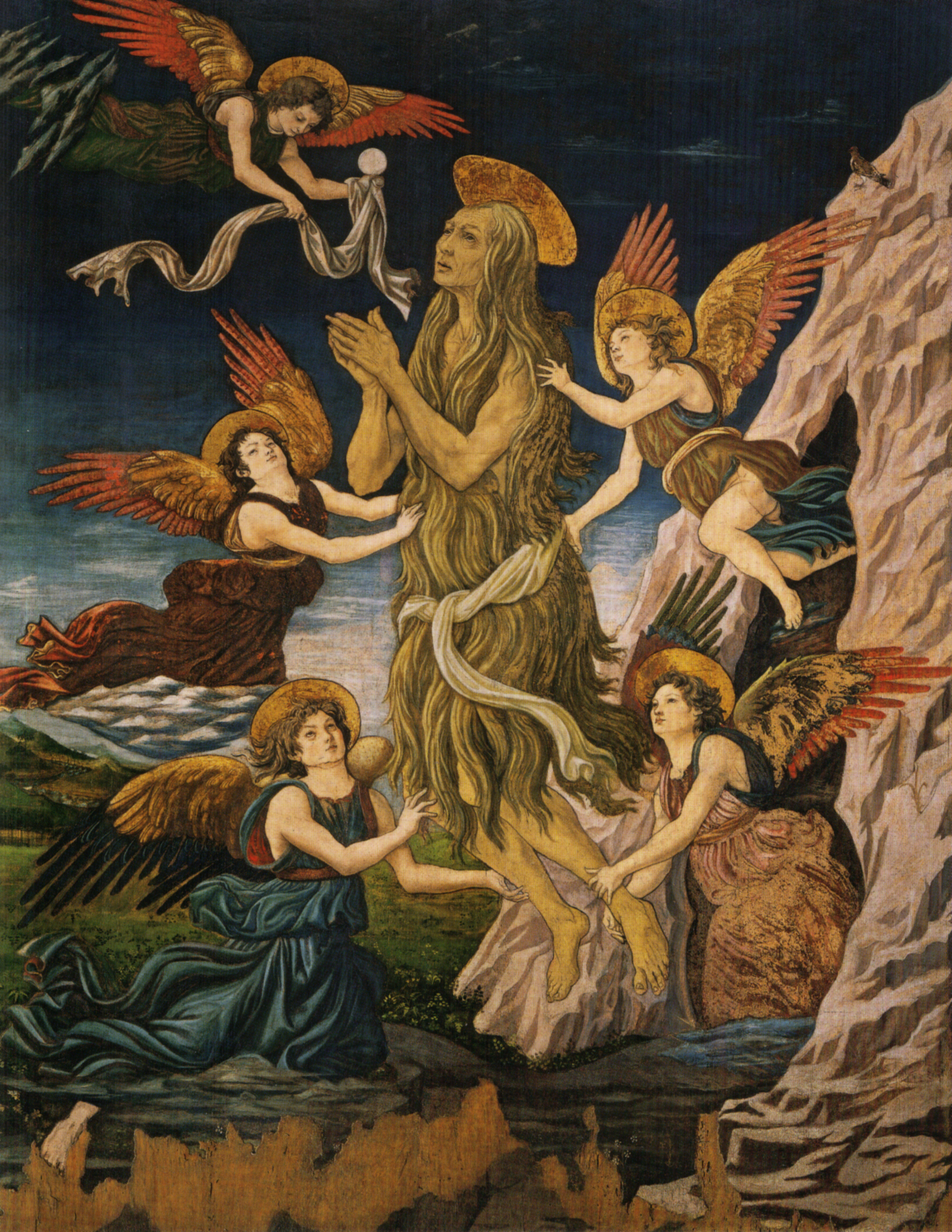
Elevation of the Magdalen (c. 1460)

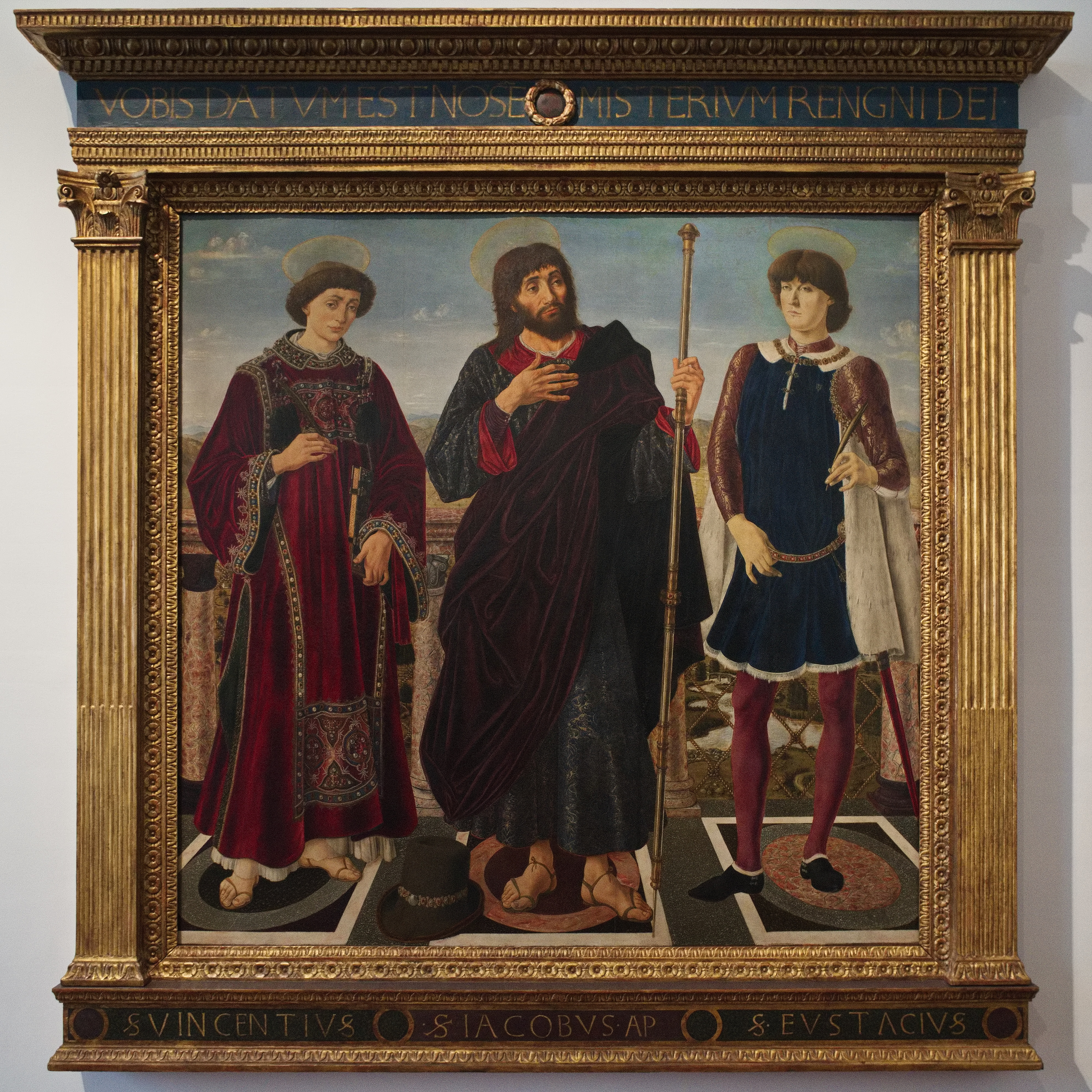
Cardinal of Portugal's Altarpiece (c. 1466)

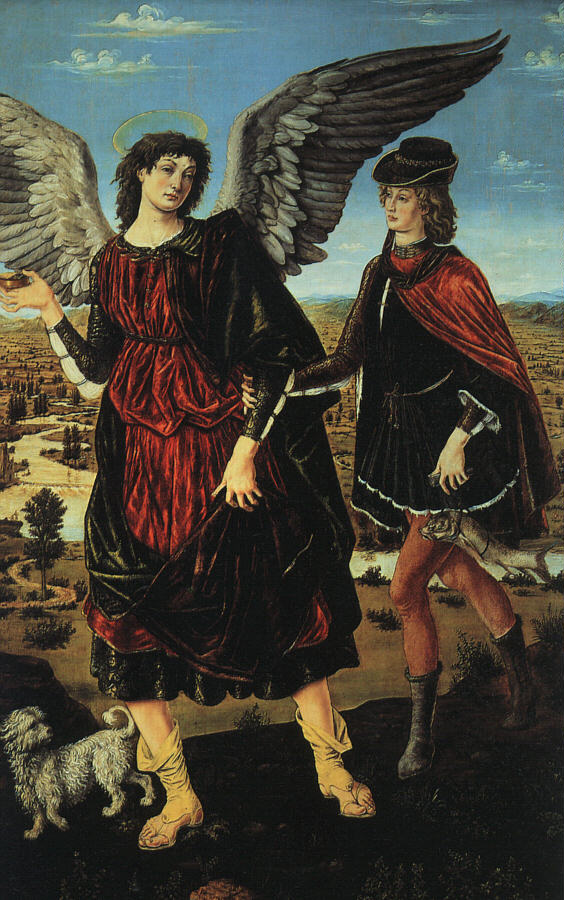
Tobias and the Angel (c. 1465–1470)

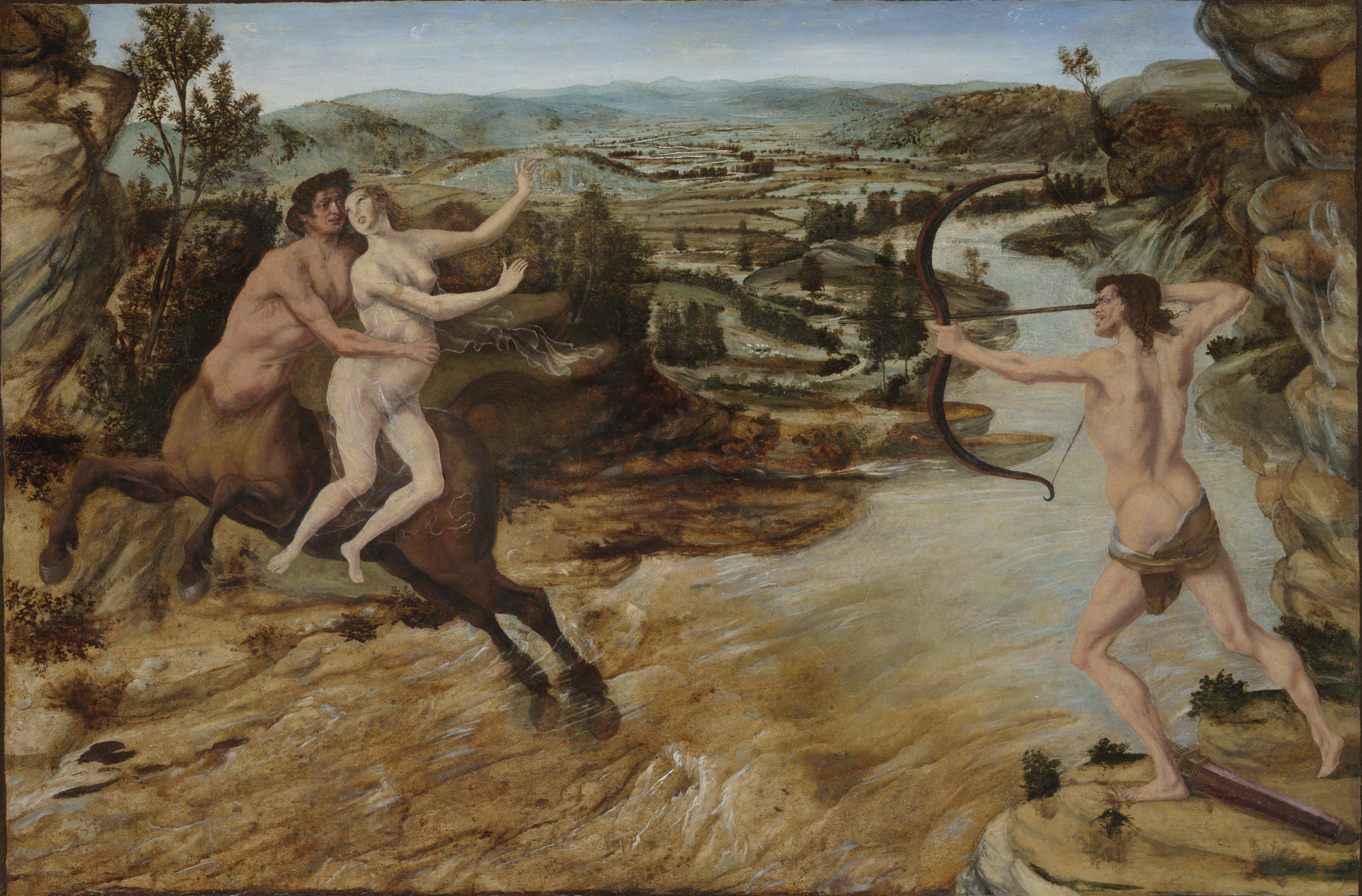
Hercules and Deianira (c. 1470)

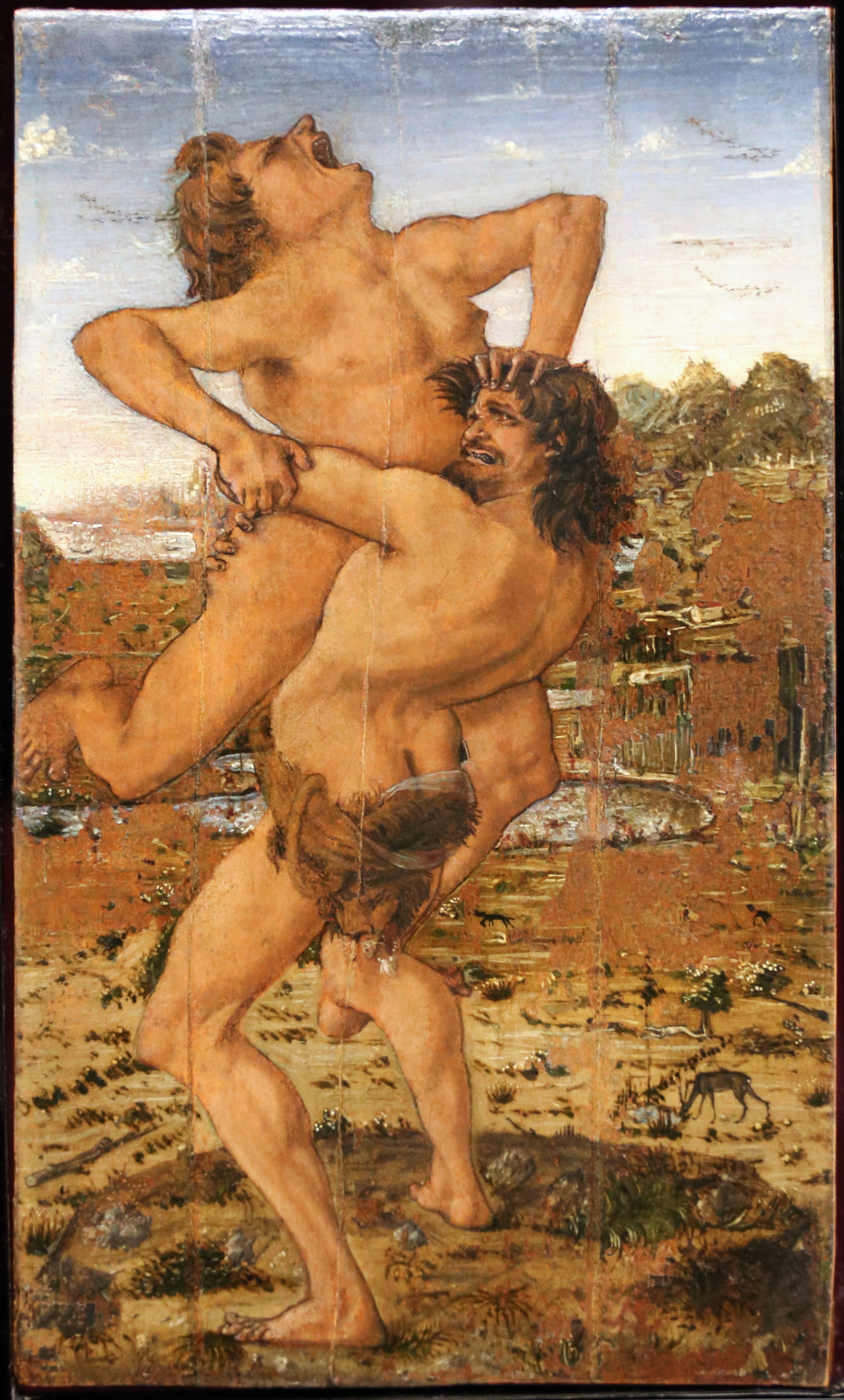
Hercules and Antaeus (c. 1470–1475)

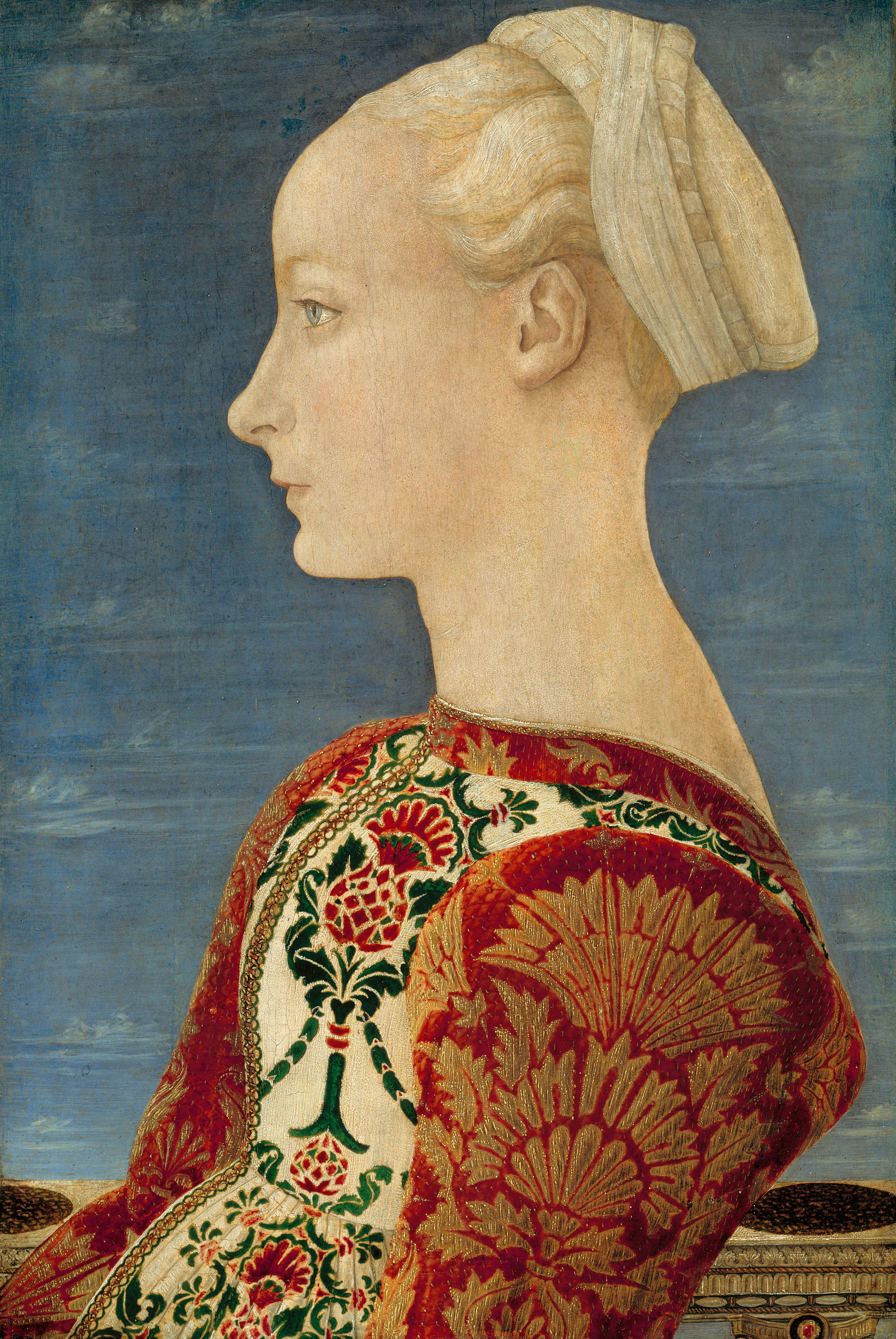
Portrait of a Young Woman, Berlin (c. 1465)
- Elevation of the Magdalen (c. 1460) – Tempera on panel, Museo della Pala del Pollaiolo, Staggia Senese
- David with the Head of Goliath, by Antonio and Piero (c. 1470) – 46.2 × 34 cm (18.1 × 13.3 in), Gemäldegalerie, Berlin
- Cardinal of Portugal's Altarpiece or Saints Vincent, James and Eustace (c. 1466) – Uffizi, copy in situ in San Miniato al Monte, Florence. By Piero according to Galli.
- Tobias and the Angel (c. 1465–1470)– Oil on panel, 187 × 118 cm (74 × 46 in), Galleria Sabauda, Turin. Given to Piero by Galli.
- Martyrdom of Saint Sebastian (1473–1475), with his brother – Panel, 292 × 223 cm, National Gallery, London
- Hercules and Deianira (c. 1470) – Oil on canvas, Yale University Art Gallery, New Haven
- Hercules and the Hydra (c. 1475) – Tempera on wood, 17 × 12 cm, Uffizi, Florence
- Hercules and Antaeus (c. 1478) – Tempera on wood, 16 × 9 cm, Uffizi, Florence
- Portrait of a Young Woman (c. 1465) – Poplar panel, 52.5 × 36.2 cm, Gemäldegalerie, Berlin
- Portrait of a Young Woman (c. 1470–1472) – Mixed medium on panel, 45.5 × 32.7 cm, Museo Poldi Pezzoli, Milan. Perhaps by Piero.
- Portrait of a Young Woman (c. 1475) – Tempera on wood, 55 × 34 cm, Uffizi, Florence

=== Sculptures ===
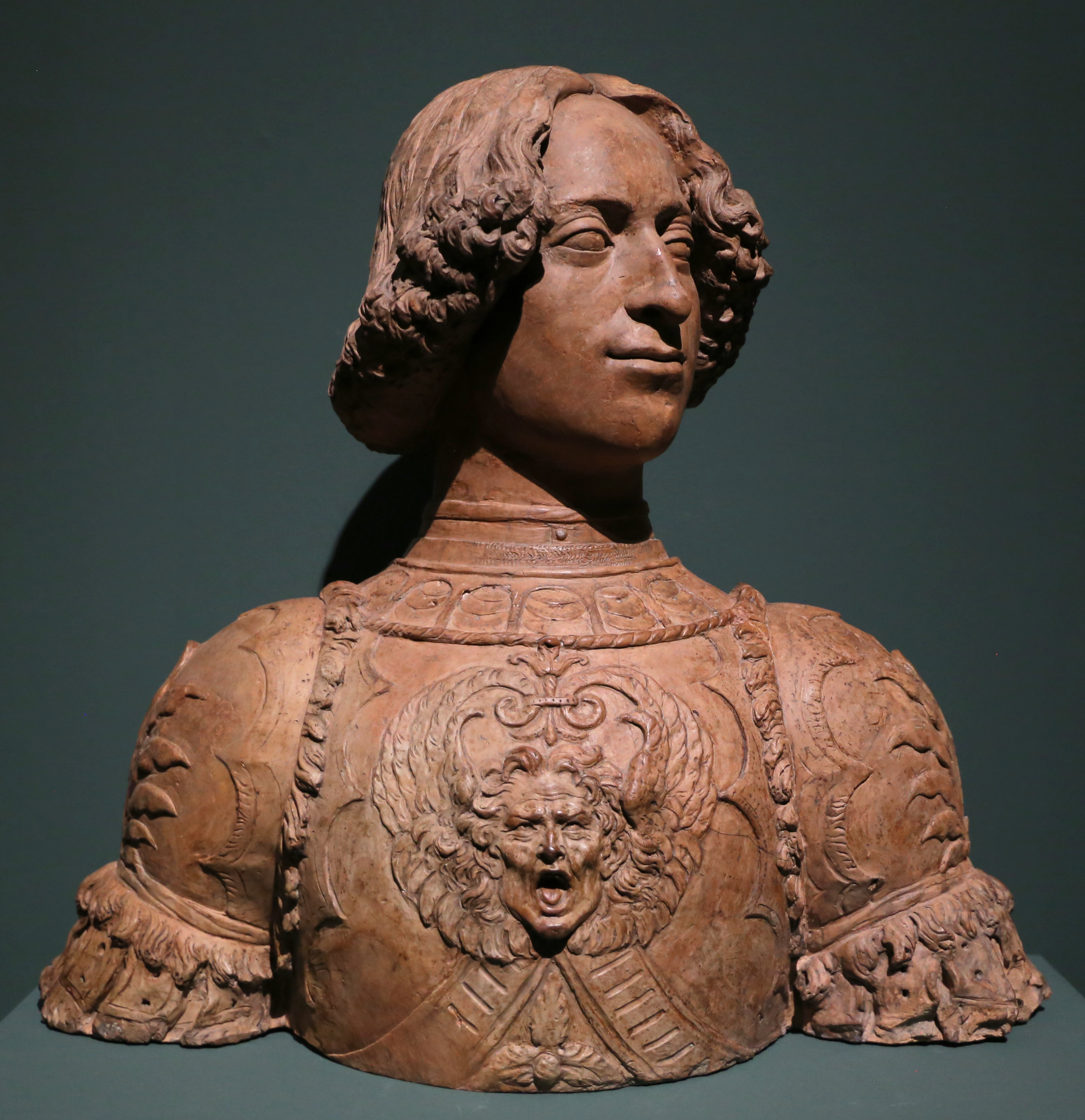
Portrait Bust of Lorenzo di Diotisalvi Neroni (c. 1459)

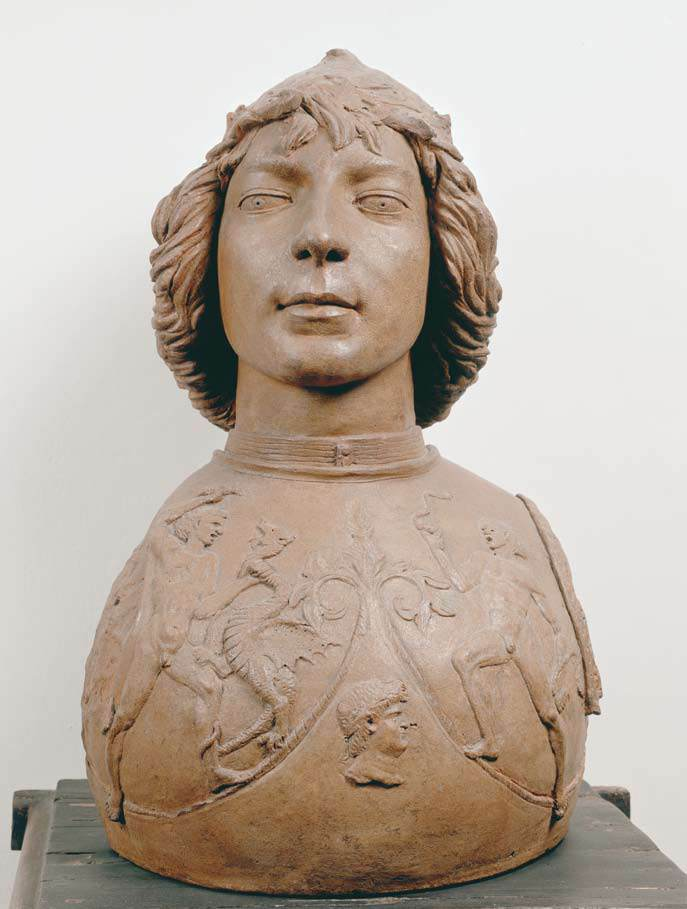
Bust of a Warrior (c. 1460)

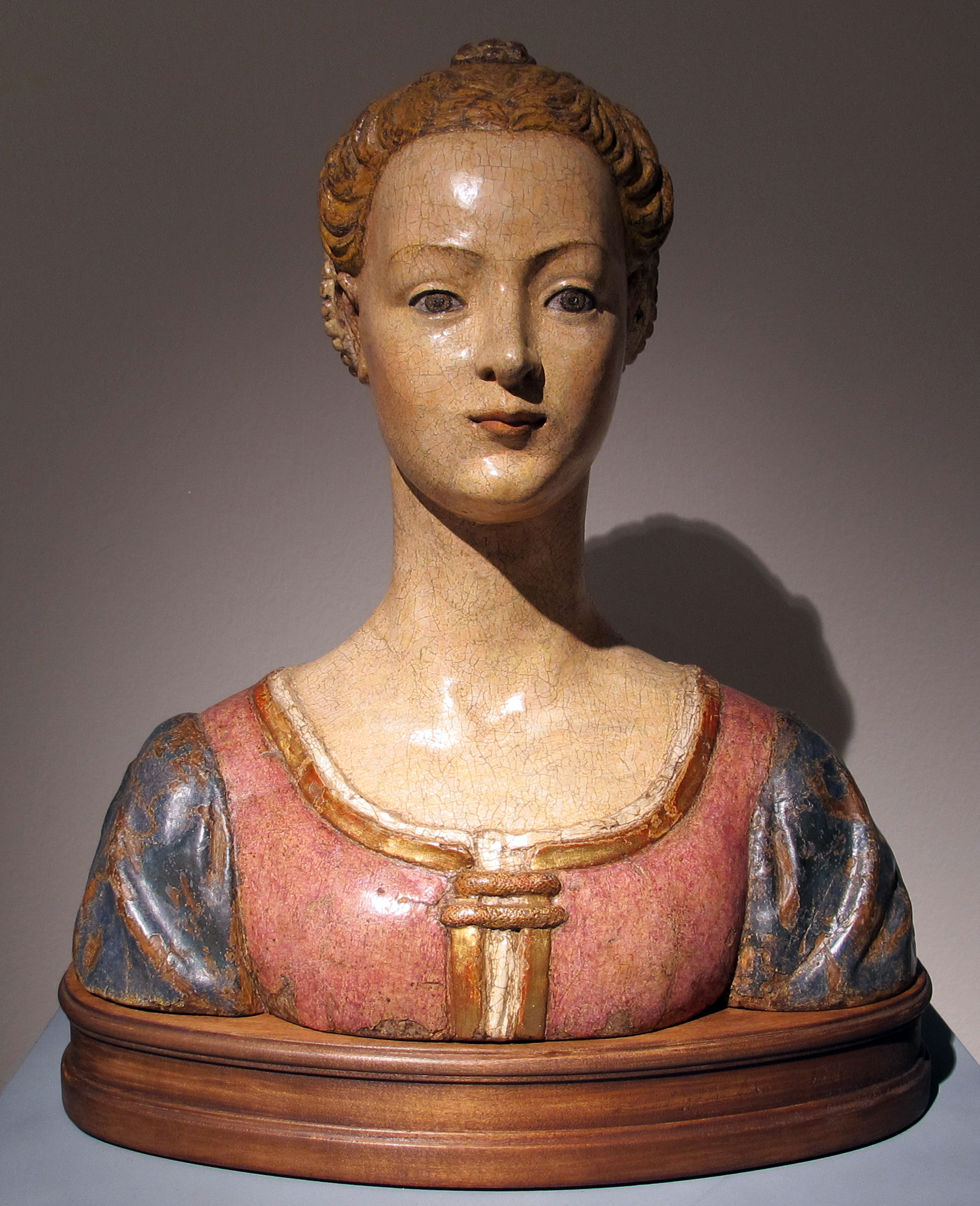
Portrait Bust of a Young Woman (c. 1460–1465)

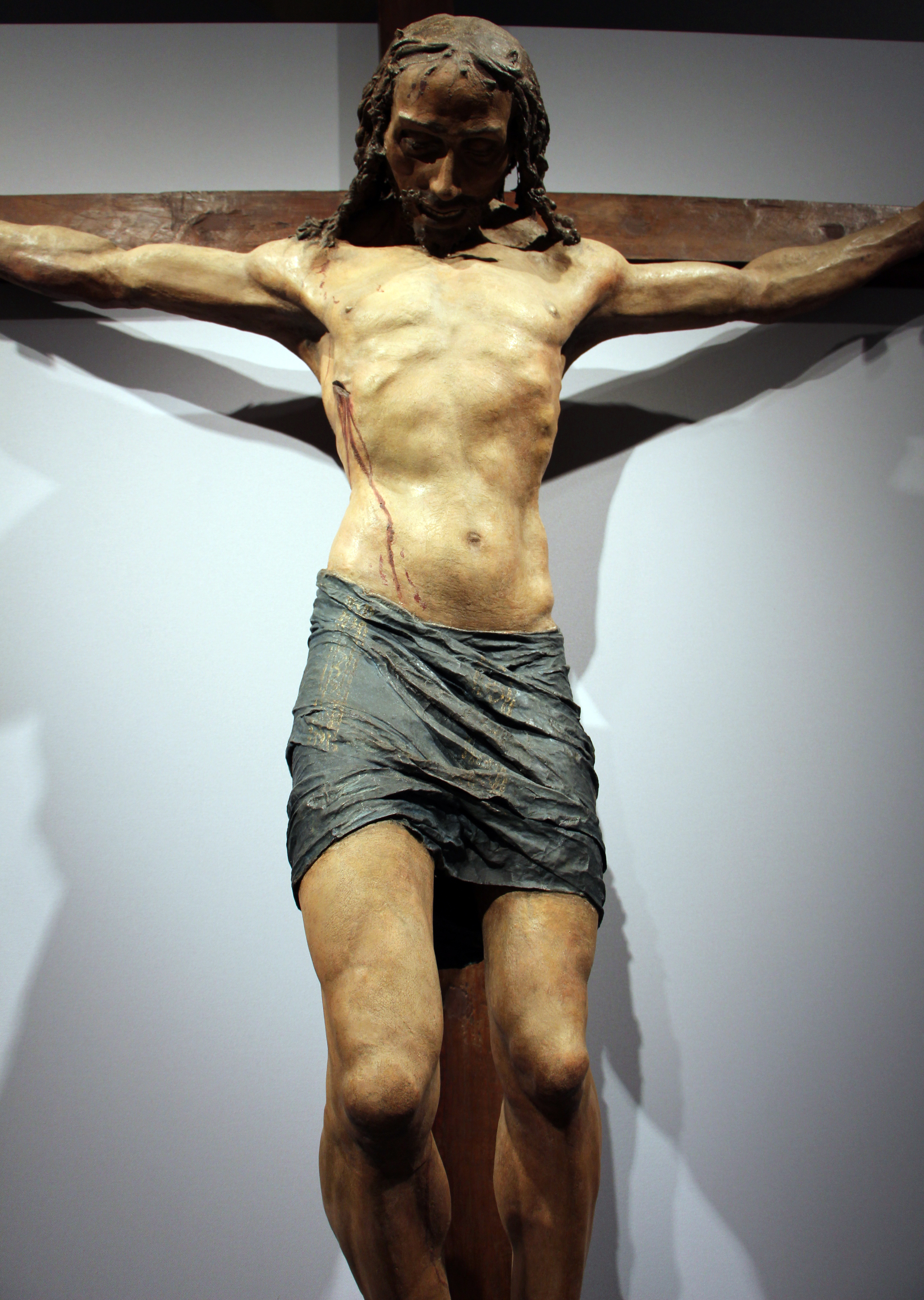
Detail of his cork crucifix (1470s)

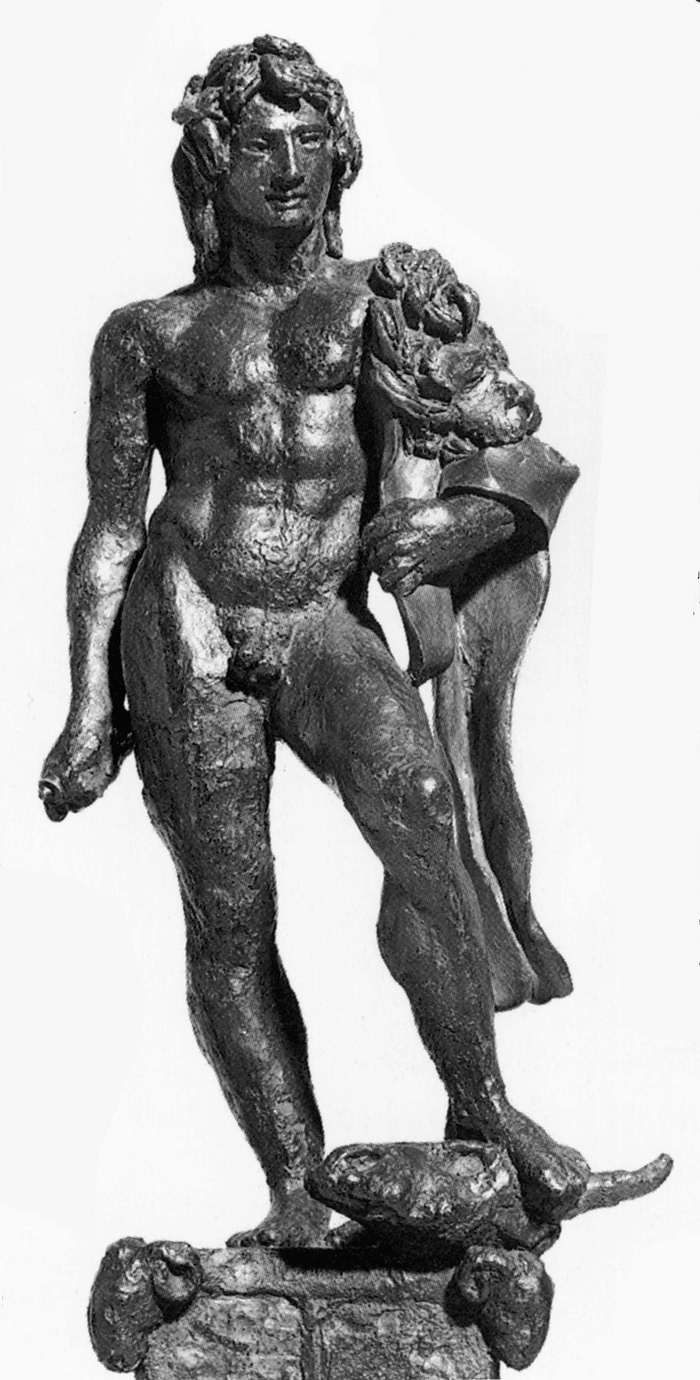
Hercules of Frick Collection (1470s)

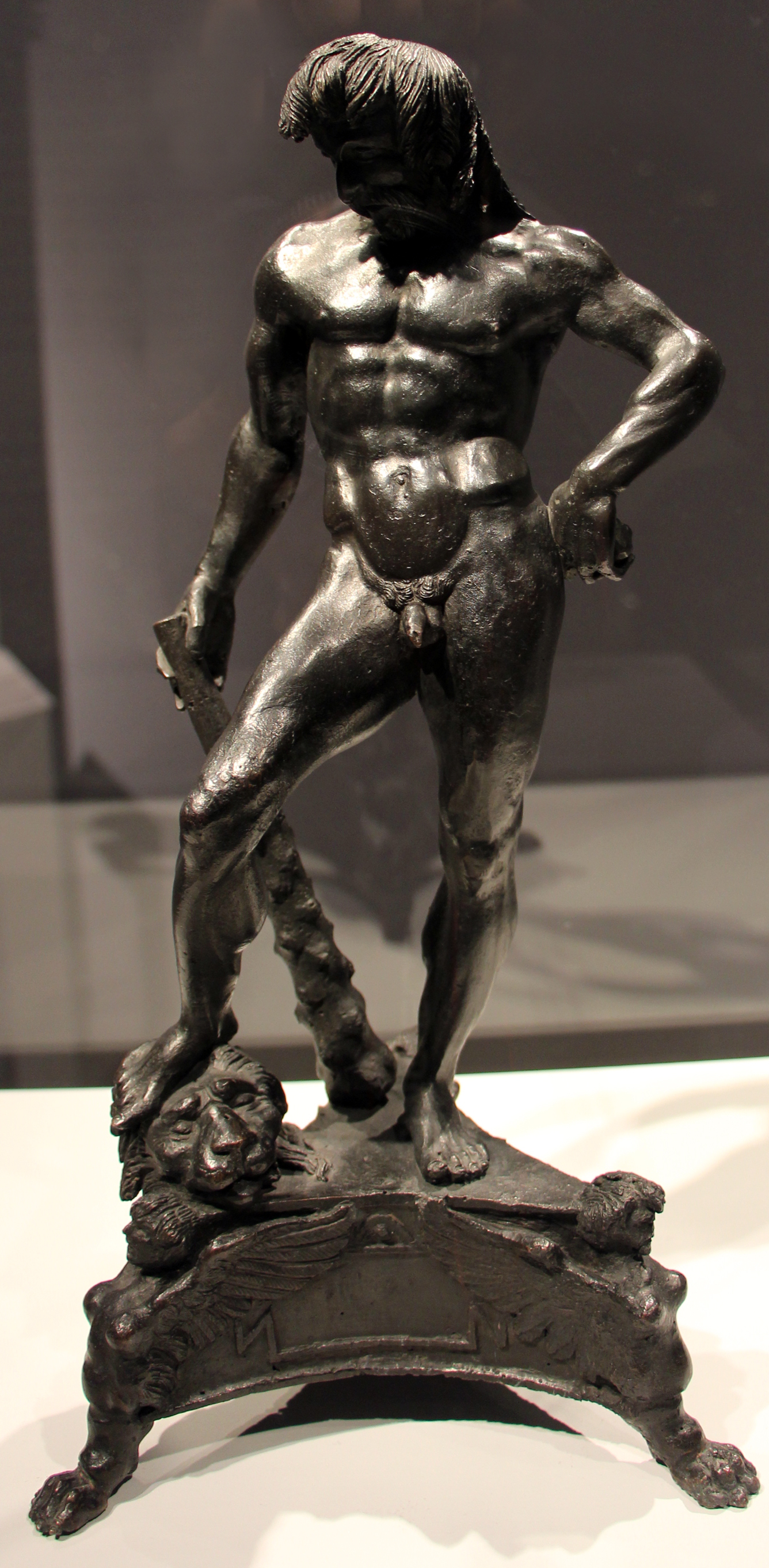
Berlin Hercules (c. 1480)
- Bust of a Warrior (c. 1460) – Terracotta, Bargello, Florence
- Portrait Bust of a Young Woman (c. 1460–1465) – Painted wood, 45 × 41 × 23 cm, private collection
- Crucifix (1470s) – Cork, San Lorenzo, Florence
- Hercules (1470s) – Bronze statuette, 44 cm, Frick Collection, New York
- Hercules (1475/80) – Bronze statuette, Bode Museum, Berlin
- Tomb of Pope Sixtus IV (1493) – Bronze, Tesoro di San Pietro, St. Peter's Basilica, Rome (Vatican City)
