= David with the Head of Goliath (Pollaiuolo) =

Painting by Antonio and Piero del Pollaiuolo

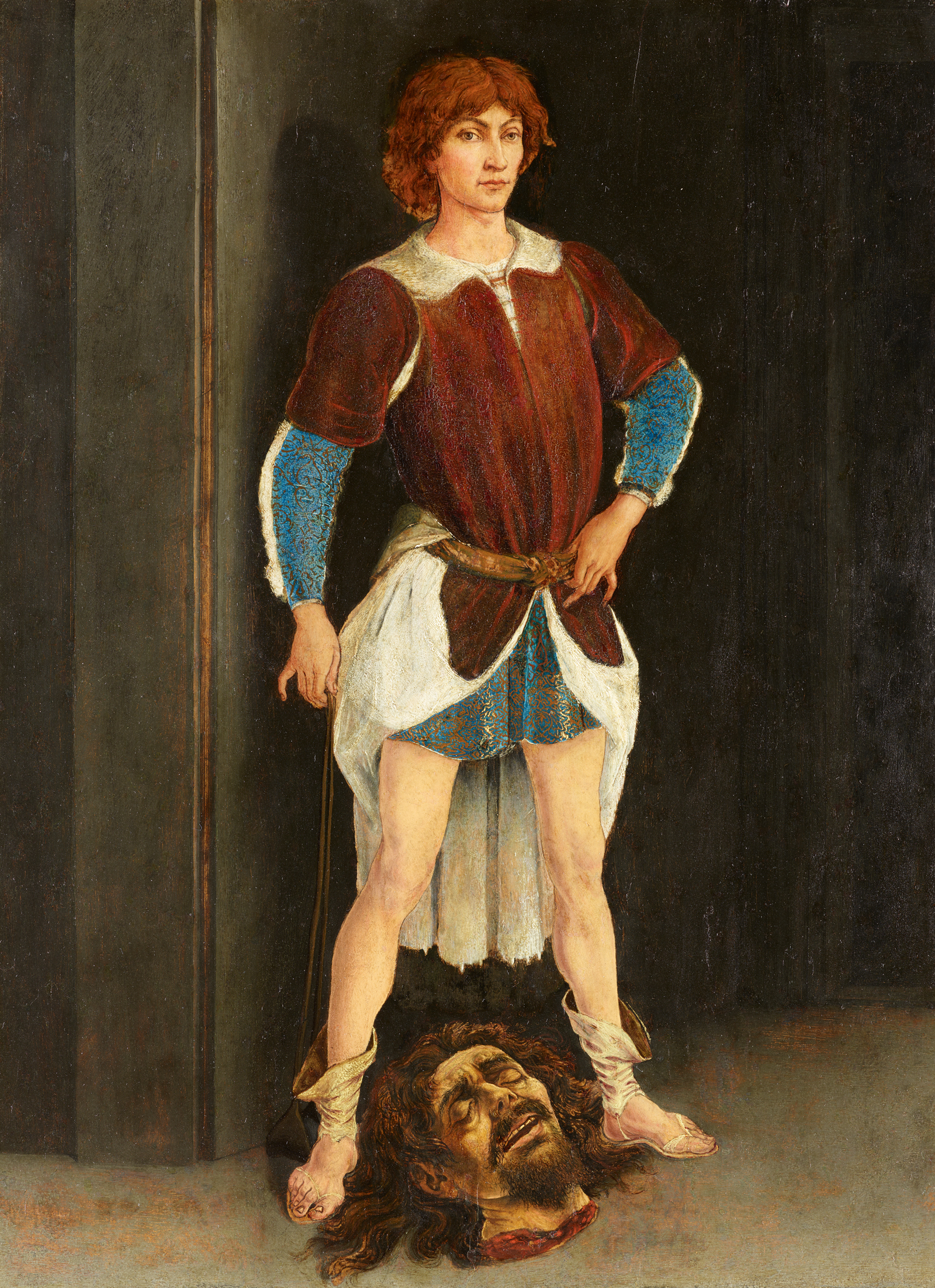
- Artist: Antonio and Piero del Pollaiuolo
- Year: c. 1470
- Medium: Oil on poplar panel
- Dimensions: 46.2 cm × 34 cm (18.2 in × 13 in)
- Location: Gemäldegalerie, Berlin

David with the Head of Goliath is an oil-on-poplar panel painting by Italian artists Antonio and Piero del Pollaiuolo, dated to around 1470. It is currently held at the Gemäldegalerie in Berlin, Germany.

Unlike other paintings and sculptures of David from the period, it had no known association with the Florentine government or the House of Medici and therefore likely hung on the wall of a private palace. It is 46.2 cm × 34 cm.

== Description ==
The painting depicts David in a refined manner, with his sling obscured along his side. His aristocratic clothing suggests David's future status as the King of Israel, while his sandals hint at his past as a young shepherd. Goliath's aged, severed head and weak expression contrast the elegant and youthful David.

== Cited works ==
- Wright, Alison (2005). The Pollaiuolo Brothers: The Arts of Florence and Rome. New Haven, Connecticut: Yale University Press. ISBN 0300106254.
