= Hercules and Deianira =

c. 1470 painting by Antonio del Pollaiuolo

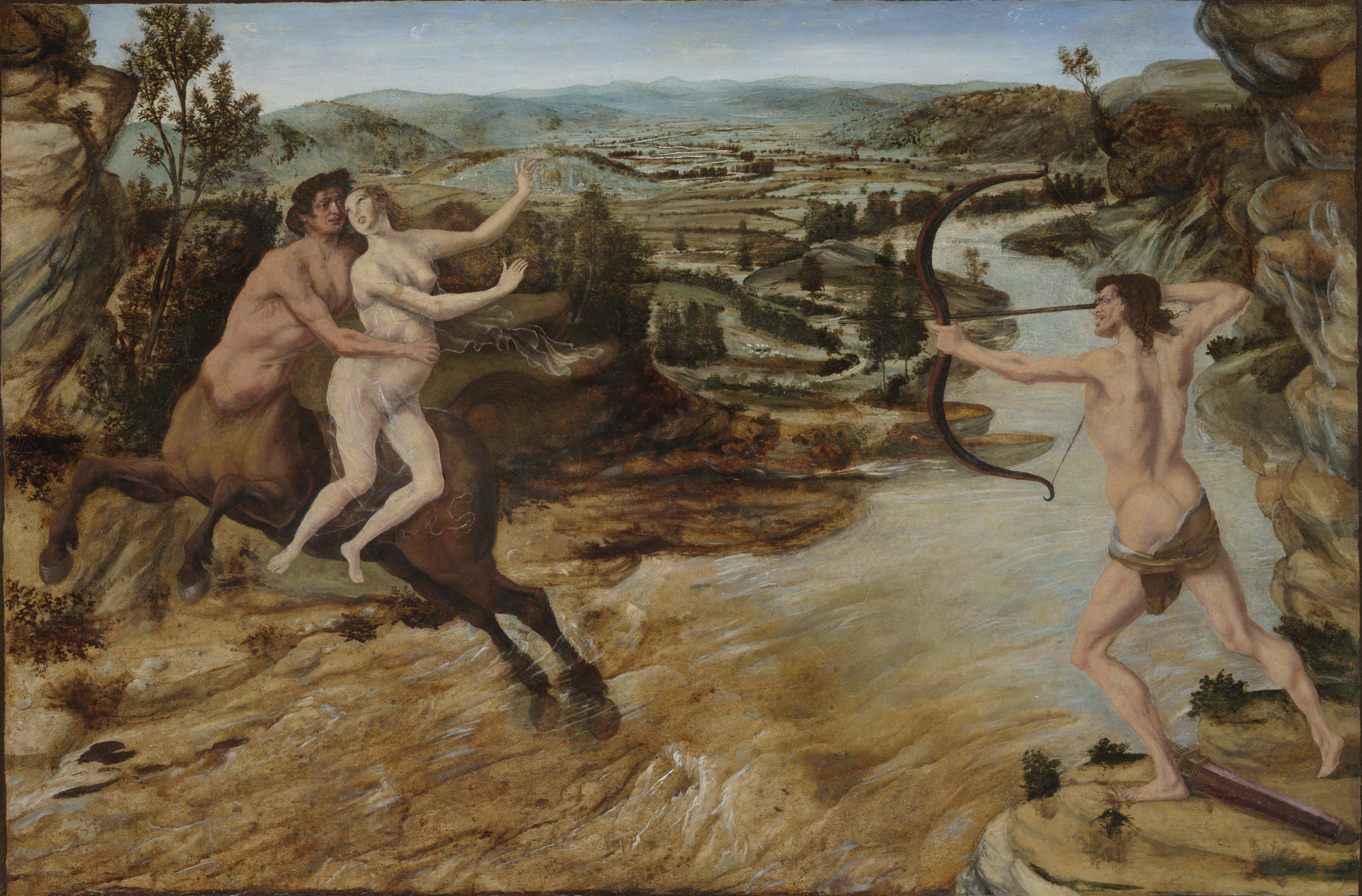
Hercules and Deianira (c. 1470) by Antonio del Pollaiuolo

Hercules and Deianira is an oil painting by Antonio del Pollaiuolo, executed c. 1470, originally on panel but later transferred to canvas. It measures 54.6 cm (21.4 in) by 79.2 cm (31.1 in), slightly larger than his other surviving mythological paintings, but still fairly small.

It shows the rape of Deianira by the centaur Nessus, with her husband Hercules drawing a bow at the right to shoot Nessus. It is now in the Yale University Art Gallery in New Haven, Connecticut.
