= Battle of the Nudes (engraving) =

Engraving by Antonio del Pollaiuolo

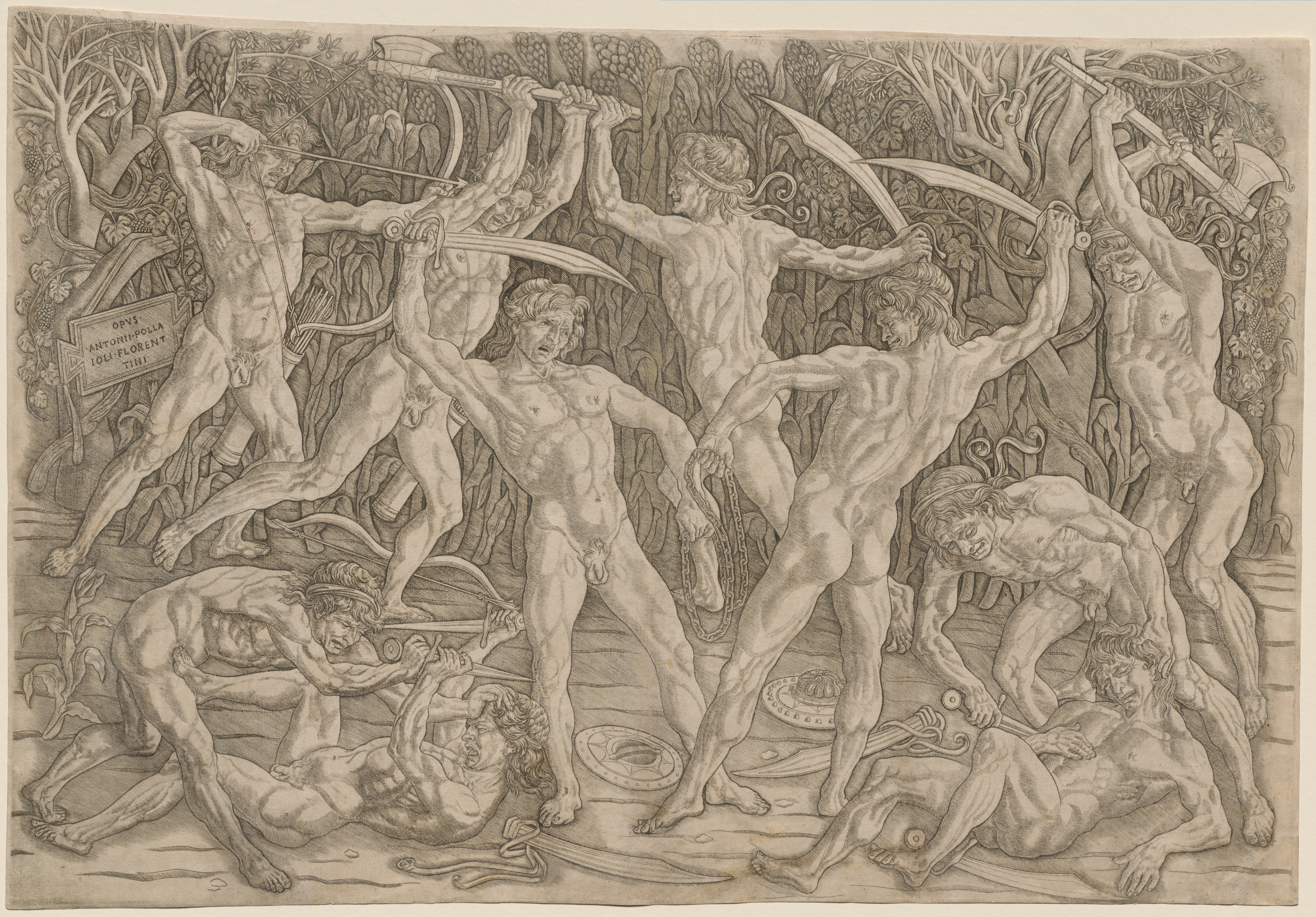
The print of Battle of the Nudes in the collection of the Cleveland Museum of Art is the only known first-state impression of the piece.

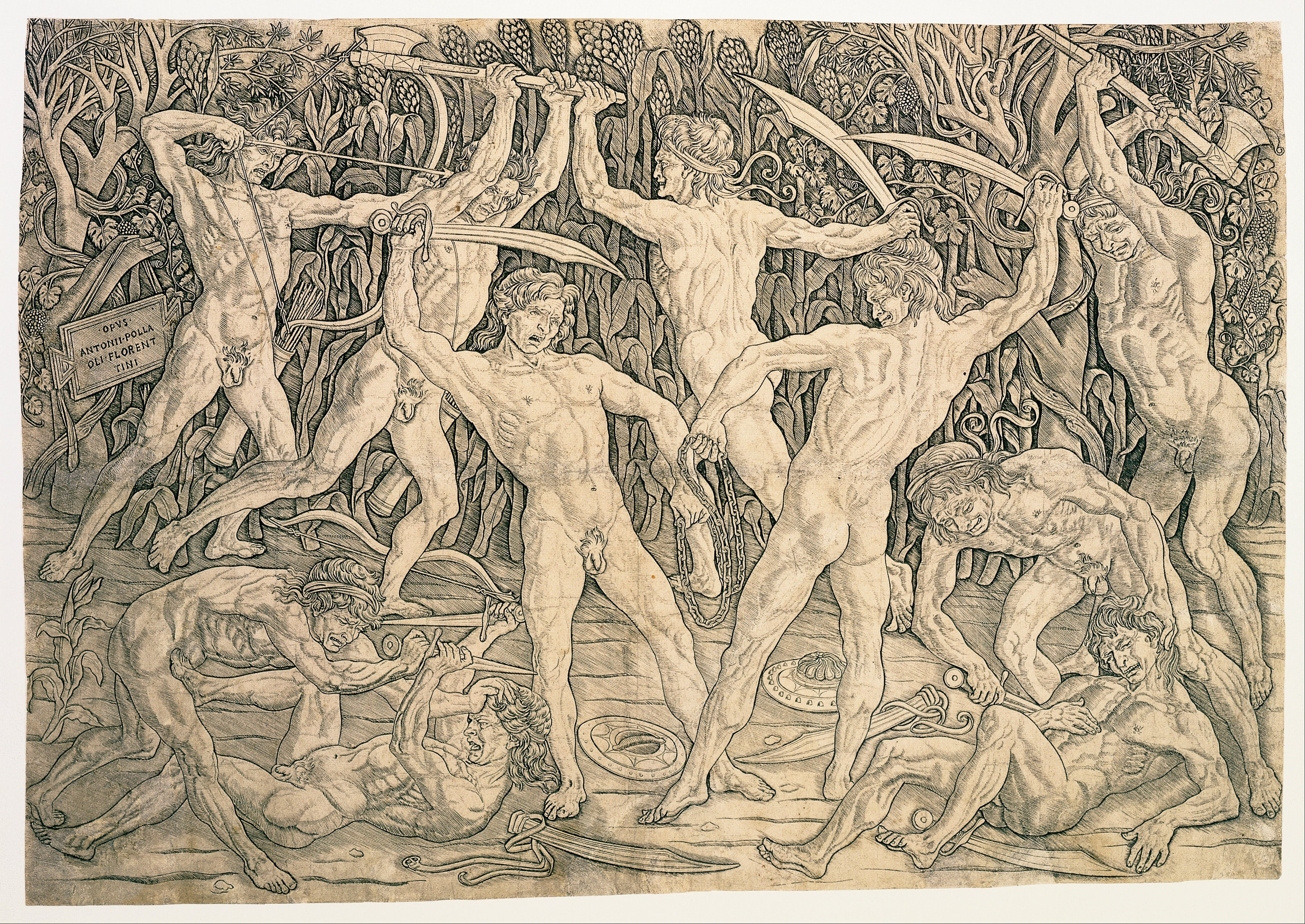
Battle of the Nude Men by Antonio del Pollaiuolo, 1465–1475. Engraving 42.4 × 60.9 cm. Second-state impression

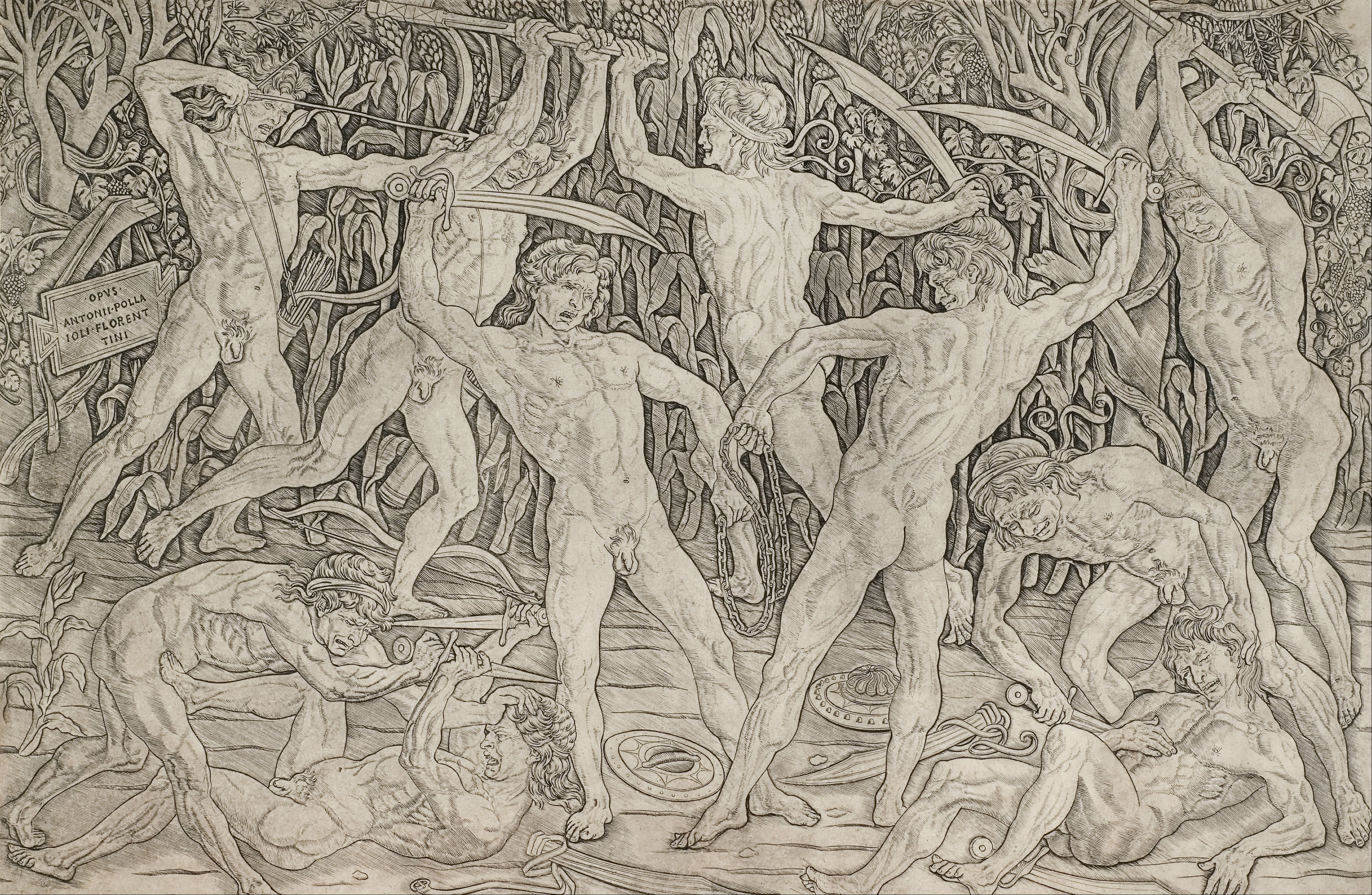
Worn second-state impression from Kansas, but enlarges well in two stages

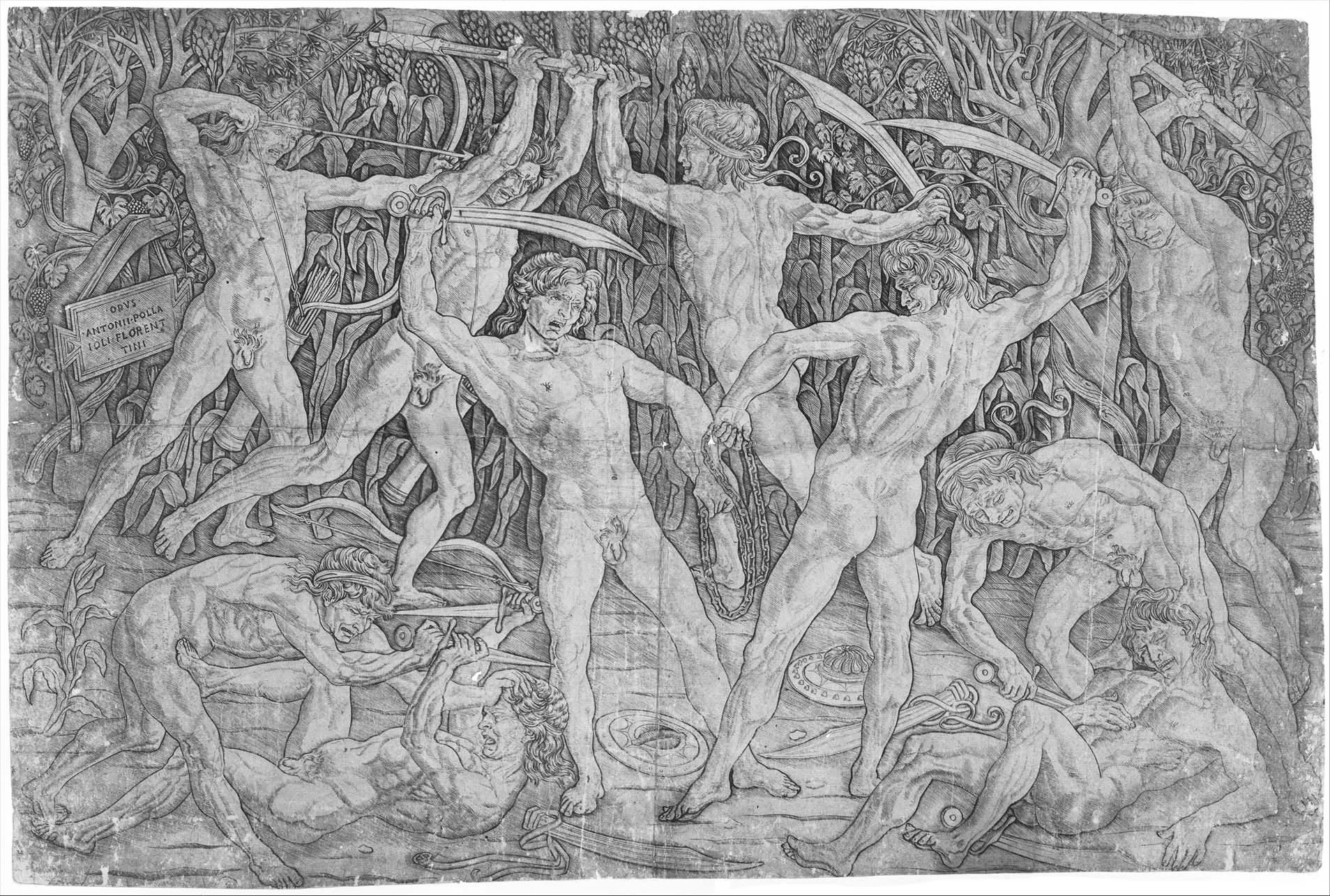
Worn second-state impression from New York; as with most engravings, reproduction on a small scale does not convey the quality of the image well. The print has been folded in four in the past.

The Battle of the Nudes or Battle of the Naked Men, probably dating from 1465–1475, is an engraving by the Florentine goldsmith and sculptor Antonio del Pollaiuolo which is one of the most significant old master prints of the Italian Renaissance. The engraving is large at 42.4 × 60.9 cm, and depicts five men wearing headbands and five men without, fighting in pairs with weapons in front of a dense background of vegetation.

All the figures are posed in different strained and athletic positions, and the print is advanced for the period in this respect. The style is classicizing, although they grimace fiercely, and their musculature is strongly emphasized. The two figures nearest the front of the picture space are in essentially the same pose, seen from in front and behind, and one purpose of the print may have been to give artists poses to copy. An effective and largely original return-stroke engraving technique was employed to model the bodies, with delicate and subtle effect.

The engraving is signed: OPVS ANTONII POLLAIOLI FLORENTINI ("the work of Antonio Pollaiuolo the Florentine") on a tablet at left. Signing a print so prominently was unusual at this period.

== Context and reception ==
Vasari, who praises the engraving highly, says that Pollaiuolo made other prints, but none have survived. Given the rarity of this one, Vasari may well be right, although he was writing many decades later. Alternatively he may have been referring to a number of prints after paintings or drawings of Pollaiuolo, but now universally seen as engraved by different artists to the battle, and now mostly attributed as "School of Pollaiuolo" or similar terms.

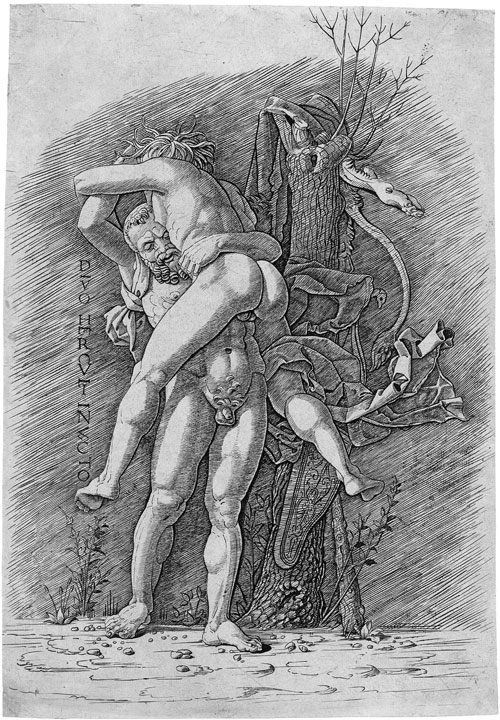
Hercules and Antaeus, engraving 1490–1500, School of Mantegna

As with Andrea Mantegna, the dominant Italian printmaker of the period, based mostly in Mantua, the suggestion has been made that Pollaiuolo may not have engraved the plate himself, but hired a specialist to work from his design. However this remains a minority view. Engraving was an essential skill of the goldsmith, and Pollaiuolo's workshop produced niello engraved plaques. Estimates of the date of the engraving have varied from about 1465 to about 1489. As with most famous prints of the period, a number of direct copies were made in engraving and woodcut, including one by "Johannes of Frankfurt" in about 1490, and it was often borrowed from and imitated, for example in a drawing probably by Raphael. It is the first print to be signed with the artist's full name (on the plaque at the left rear), as opposed to the initials or monograms used by many printmakers.

The print clearly relates to the work of Mantegna, although uncertainty about the dating of the works of both artists means that the direction of influence is unclear. Mantegna made two large engravings of the Battle of the Sea-Gods, and he or his followers produced a number of others of male nudes fighting under various classical titles. Despite the usual attempts by art historians, including in this case Erwin Panofsky, to identify a specific subject for the engraving, it is likely none was intended. The two central figures grasp the ends of a large chain, which may suggest that the figures are to be seen as gladiators.

Vasari wrote of Pollaiuolo:

He had a more modern grasp of the nude than the masters who preceded him, and he dissected many bodies to study their anatomy; and he was the first to demonstrate the method of searching out the muscles, in order that they might have their due form and place in his figures; and of those ... he engraved a battle.

On the other hand, it has been suggested that Leonardo da Vinci may have had Pollaiuolo partly in mind when he wrote that artists should not

make their nudes wooden and without grace, so that they seem to look like a sack of nuts rather than the surface of a human being, or indeed a bundle of radishes rather than muscular nudes

A recent paper suggests that the image depicts a duel between two noblemen that has degenerated into a more widespread confrontation involving the lower classes. It is further posited that Pollaiuolo's contemporaries would have recognised a difference in social class among combatants based on differences in armour, weapons and actions. These and other signifiers can be traced to a literary source, Giovanni da Legnano's legal treatise Tractatus de bello, de represaliis et de duello from the late fourteenth century.

Recent inquiries into the meaning of the work also suggest that this remarkable battle scene had impacted artists even after Mantegna. While the nude figures are idealized through the various poses, the figures can be seen time and time again in other works completed by other Venetian artists such as Jacopo de' Barbari in his "Battle Between Satyrs and Men", completed just before the end of the 15th century.

== States ==
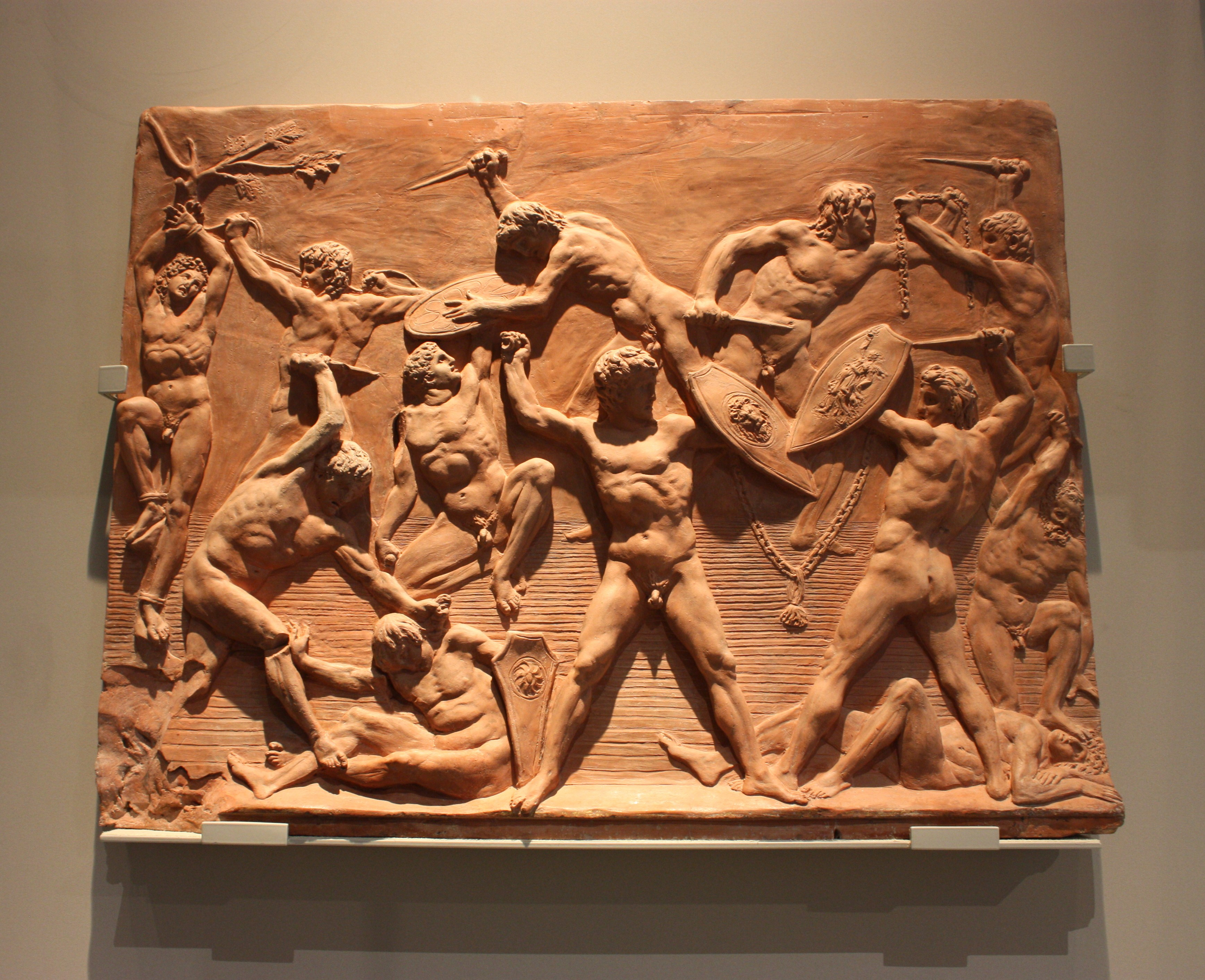
Terracotta plaque also by Pollaiuolo

Like most 15th-century prints, the Battle is rare. The unique first-state impression in the print room of the Cleveland Museum of Art is generally accepted as much the finest, and about forty-nine impressions (single examples) survive of the second state, which is actually a high number for a 15th-century print. For the period, the print is very large, which has probably contributed to the small number of surviving impressions – it is clear from the worn state of the plate in many impressions that large numbers, probably running into the hundreds, were printed of the second state. There are no significant differences between the two states, so the plate was probably reworked just because it had worn out from the printing of now lost first-state impressions.

The existence of the first state was only realized in 1967, after Cleveland bought their print from the Liechtenstein collection. The best impression of the second state is in the Fogg Art Museum at Harvard; it appears to be the only one printed before the plate received a scratch, and from the paper and watermark would appear to have been printed close in time to the Cleveland impression. The two woodcut copies can be shown to have been copied from the first state.

== Date ==
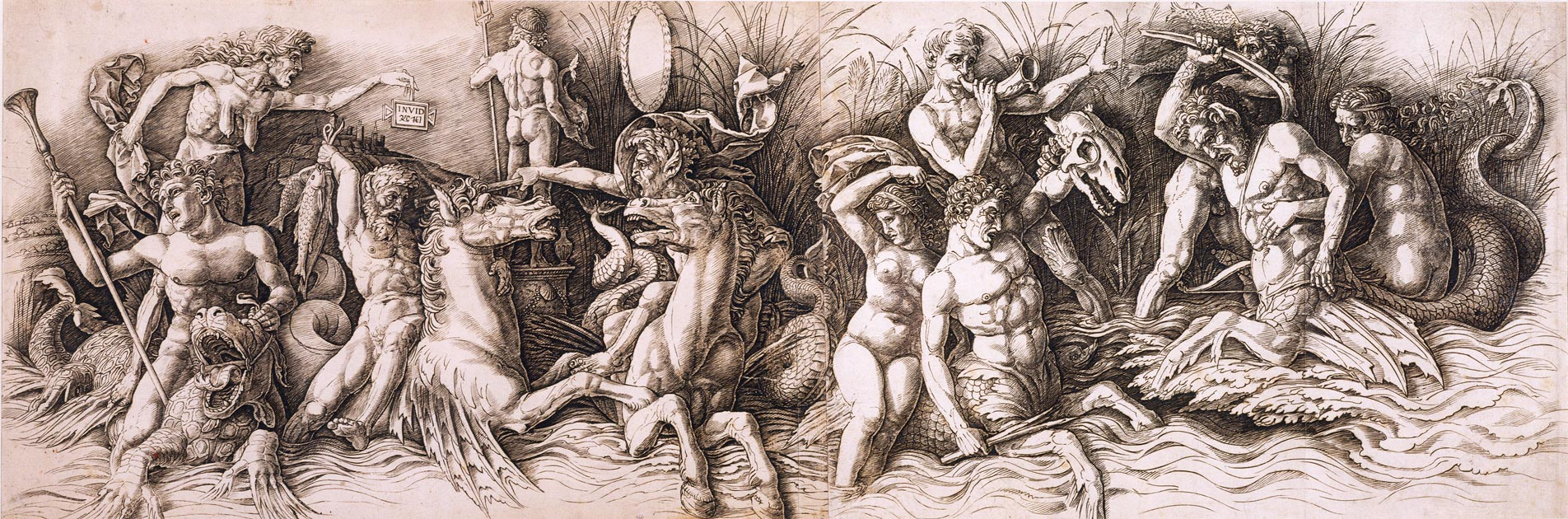
Andrea Mantegna, Battle of the Sea-Gods, c. 1490

Although most art historians have dated the work to the period 1465–1475, in 1984 the suggestion was made that the print draws directly from a Roman sculpture of three satyrs struggling with a serpent, which was excavated in Rome in 1488 or 1489 and subsequently acquired by Lorenzo de' Medici. Pollaiuolo was in Rome from 1484, and this would mean the print was executed there. This suggestion remains the subject of debate.

== Surviving impressions ==
There are fifty impressions known to have survived to 1939; their distribution gives an interesting insight into the spread of top-class old master prints. As at the census in Langdale in 2002, there are sixteen in the United States, all apparently arrived since 1890, and mostly during the period 1930–1960. Italy has nine impressions, England five, and Paris three. There were five in Germany in 1939, of which one seems definitely to have been destroyed during World War II, one other "lost" from Bremen, and one lost sight of after the war. The other impressions outside Europe are in Melbourne and Ottawa; in Europe the Albertina in Vienna, the Netherlands (3), Strasbourg (1) and Budapest have impressions. Two of the three impressions in Switzerland are the only ones in the world still in private collections.
