= Guido Carocci =

Italian historian

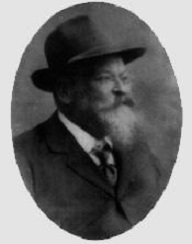
Carocci

Guido Carocci (16 September 1851 - 20 September 1916) was an Italian historian of Florence and its historic buildings. He was born and died in the Florence. When he was born Florence was the capital of the Grand Duchy of Tuscany. He was also director of its National Museum of San Marco and fought the destruction of the city centre by the building works of the Risanamento. He is buried in the Cimitero di Soffiano.

== Sources ==
- G. Carocci, Gli affreschi di Andrea del Castagno nella villa Pandolfini presso Firenze, Bollettino d'Arte, 8, 1907
- G. Carocci, Il Museo di S. Marco di Firenze ed alcuni suoi nuovi acquisti, Bollettino d'Arte, 10, 1911
