= Staggia Senese =

- Frazione
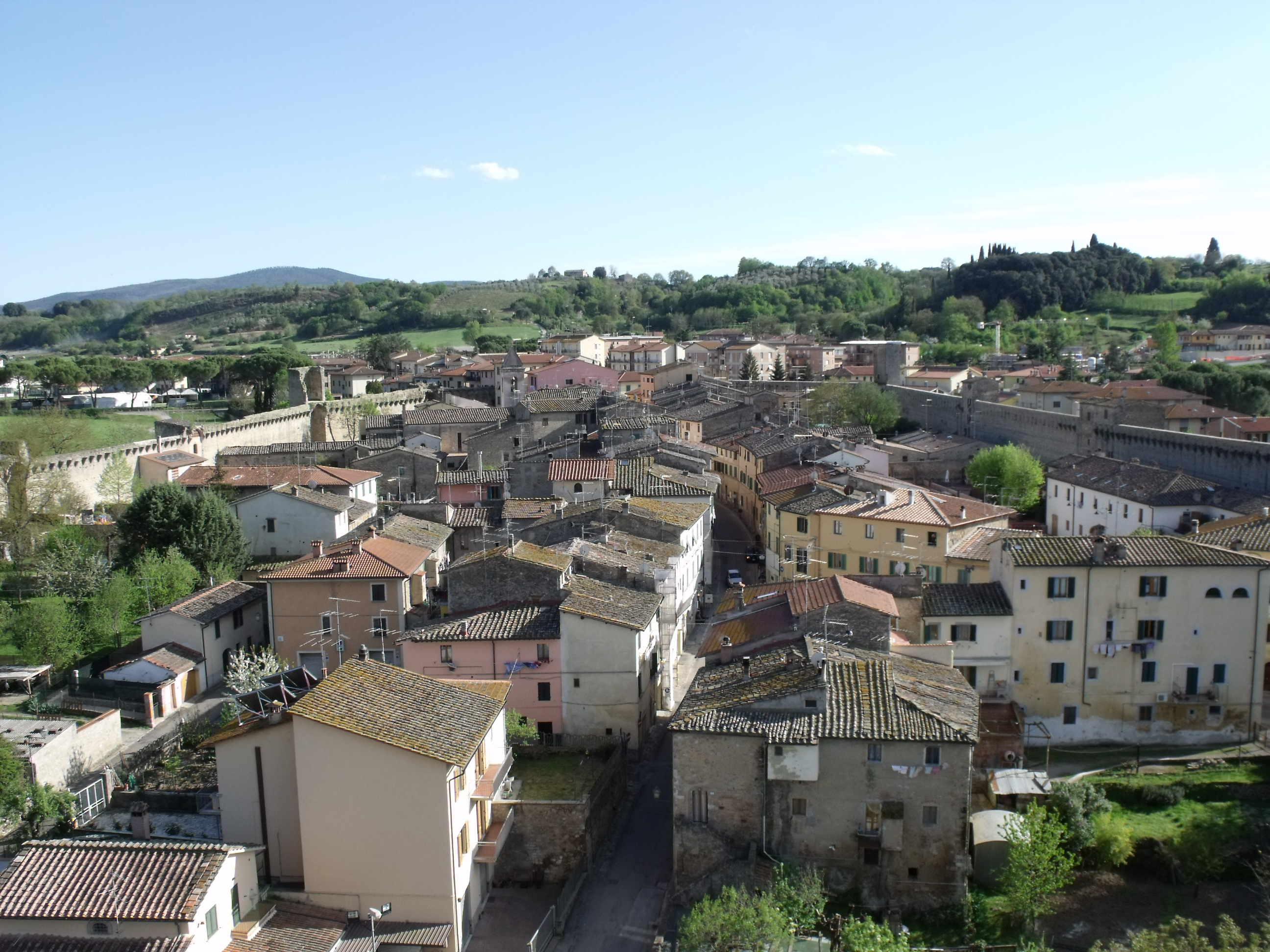
- View of Staggia Senese

- Location of Staggia Senese in Italy
- Coordinates: 43°25′19″N 11°10′57″E
- Country: Italy
- Region: Tuscany
- Province: Siena (SI)
- Comune: Poggibonsi
- Elevation: 168 m (551 ft)

Population (2011)
  - Total: 2,548
- Demonym: Staggesi
- Time zone: UTC+1 (CET)
  - Summer (DST): UTC+2 (CEST)

Staggia Senese is a village in Tuscany, central Italy, administratively a frazione of the comune of Poggibonsi, province of Siena. At the time of the 2001 census its population was 2,129.

Staggia Senese is about 25 km from Siena and 8 km from Poggibonsi.
