= Profile Portrait of a Young Lady =

1465 portrait attributed to Antonio del Pollaiuolo

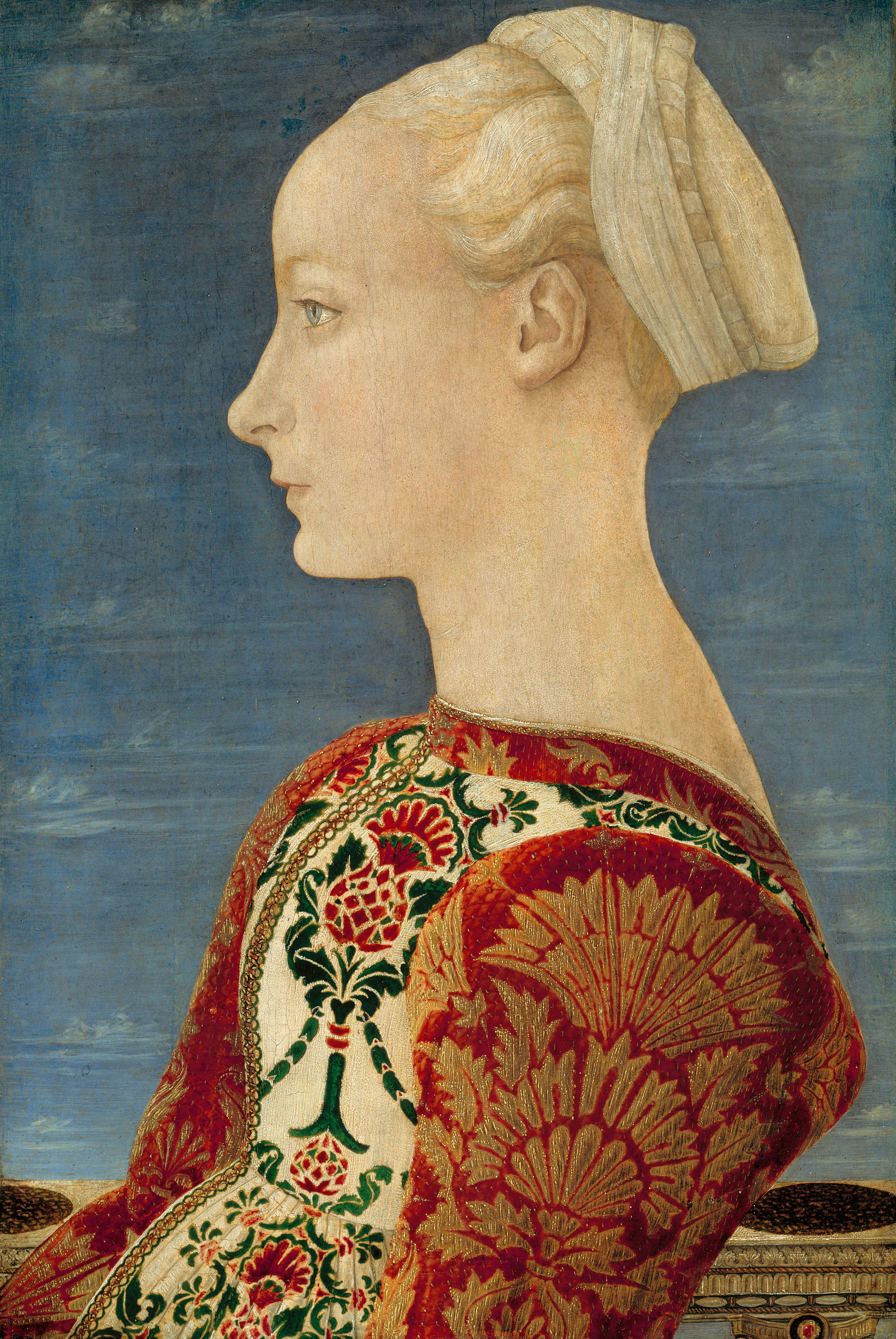
- Artist: Antonio or Piero del Pollaiuolo
- Year: 1465
- Type: Oil on wood
- Dimensions: 52.2 cm × 36.2 cm (20.6 in × 14.3 in)
- Location: Gemäldegalerie, Berlin

Profile Portrait of a Young Lady is a 1465 half-length portrait, made with oil-based paint and tempera on a poplar panel, usually attributed to Antonio del Pollaiuolo, although the owning museum, the Gemäldegalerie in Berlin, now describes this work as by his brother Piero del Pollaiuolo, and as one of its most famous paintings, and as one of the most famous portraits of women from the early Italian Renaissance.

== Description ==
The anonymous woman is depicted in a brocade dress, with her posture suggesting that she is sitting in the marble embrasure of a window or balcony, with her profile heightened by the bright blue sky in the background. Her blonde hair is gathered under a light bonnet. The emphatic use of line and the clarity of the contrasting colour surfaces are typical features of the Florentine School.

Similar profile portraits of high-status women in sumptuous clothing were painted to celebrate a marriage, but the absence of jewellery may indicate this portrait shows the subject shortly before rather than just after a wedding ceremony. The unusually rich bodice has a brocade of three colours, red, white and green, depicting pomegranates with foliage and palmettes, symmetrical about a central line of fasteners, with red velvet sleeves embroidered with gold thread. The woman is sitting beside a balustrade inlaid with porphyry and jewels, similar to the balustrade depicted in the Cardinal of Portugal's Altarpiece at San Miniato al Monte in Florence, painted by Antonio del Pollaiuolo and his brother Piero del Pollaiuolo in 1466–67.

== Attribution ==
The attribution of this portrait has troubled art historians since it first came to public attention. It was in the Galerie Massias in Paris in 1815, and passed through the collection of Earl of Ashburnham, at that time attributed to Botticelli. It was later attributed to Piero della Francesca (compare his portrait of Battista Sforza), and it was sold through the art dealers Colnaghi in London in 1897–1898 and acquired by the Gemäldegalerie in Berlin. In 1897, Wilhelm von Bode noted a resemblance to a portrait of a young woman held by the Museo Poldi Pezzoli in Milan, also then ascribed to Piero della Francesca, but Bode attributed both to Domenico Veneziano. The Gemäldegalerie followed Bode's attribution until 1972, but it was not widely accepted and it is now thought to be incorrect (the work in Milan is now ascribed to Piero del Pollaiuolo instead). Bernard Berenson attributed to the painting to Verrocchio and then to Alesso Baldovinetti (compare his Portrait of a Lady in Yellow).

In 1911, Adolfo Venturi attributed this work to Antonio del Pollaiuolo, and that attribution is still accepted as secure by most scholars, although a minority have suggested instead his brother Piero del Pollaiuolo. The Gemäldegalerie catalogue suggests that the varied experience of Antonio del Pollaiuolo working as a goldsmith, as a bronze maker, and as a designer of embroidery, makes him a likely candidate for the realistic depiction of the embroidered clothing in the portrait. However, Leopold Ettlinger suggested in 1963 and in a monograph on the Pollaiuolo brothers in 1978 that it should be treated as anonymous.

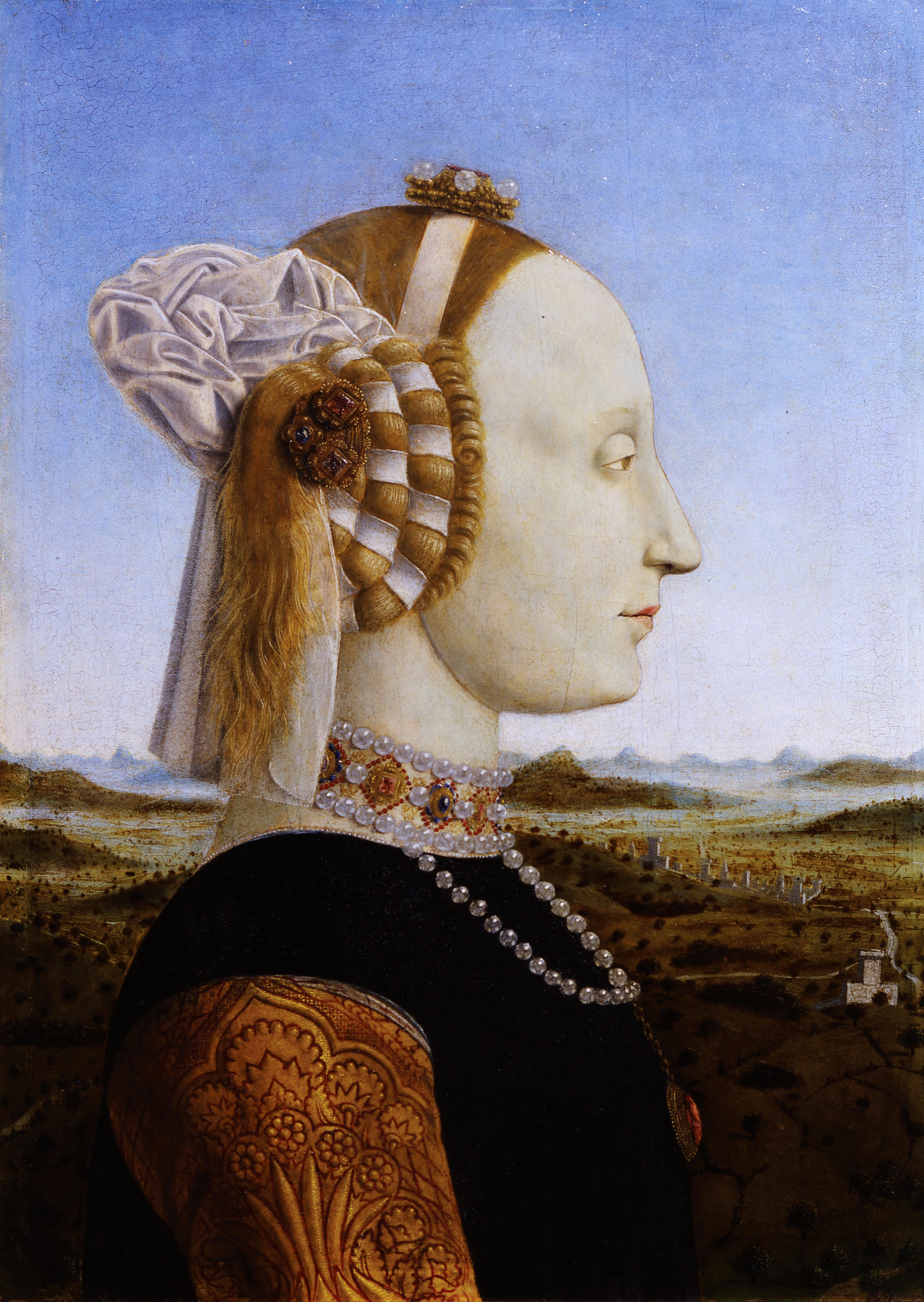
Piero della Francesca, Portrait of Battista Sforza, c. 1472–1473, Uffizi Gallery, Florence

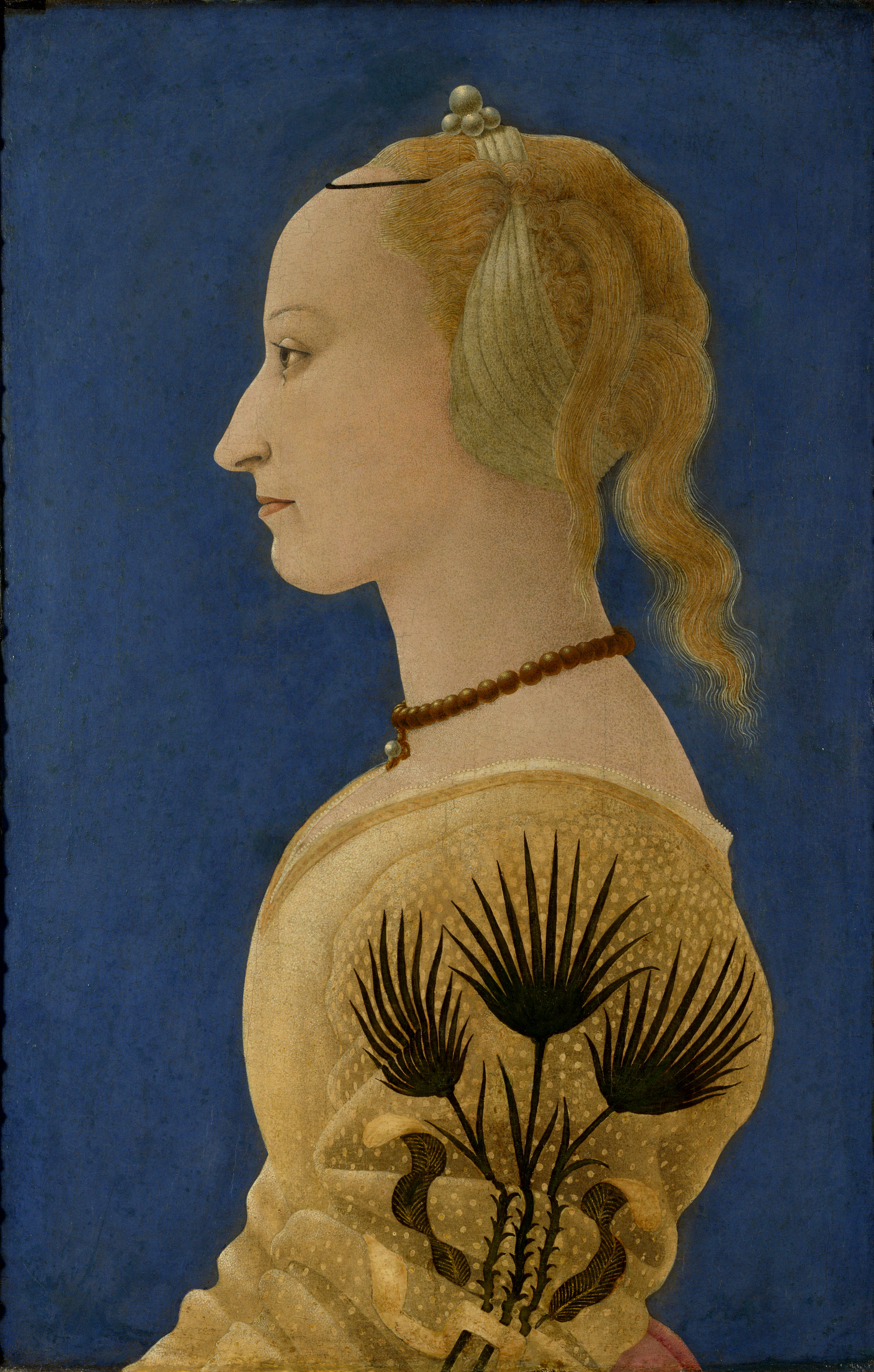
Alesso Baldovinetti, Portrait of a Lady in Yellow, c. 1465, National Gallery, London

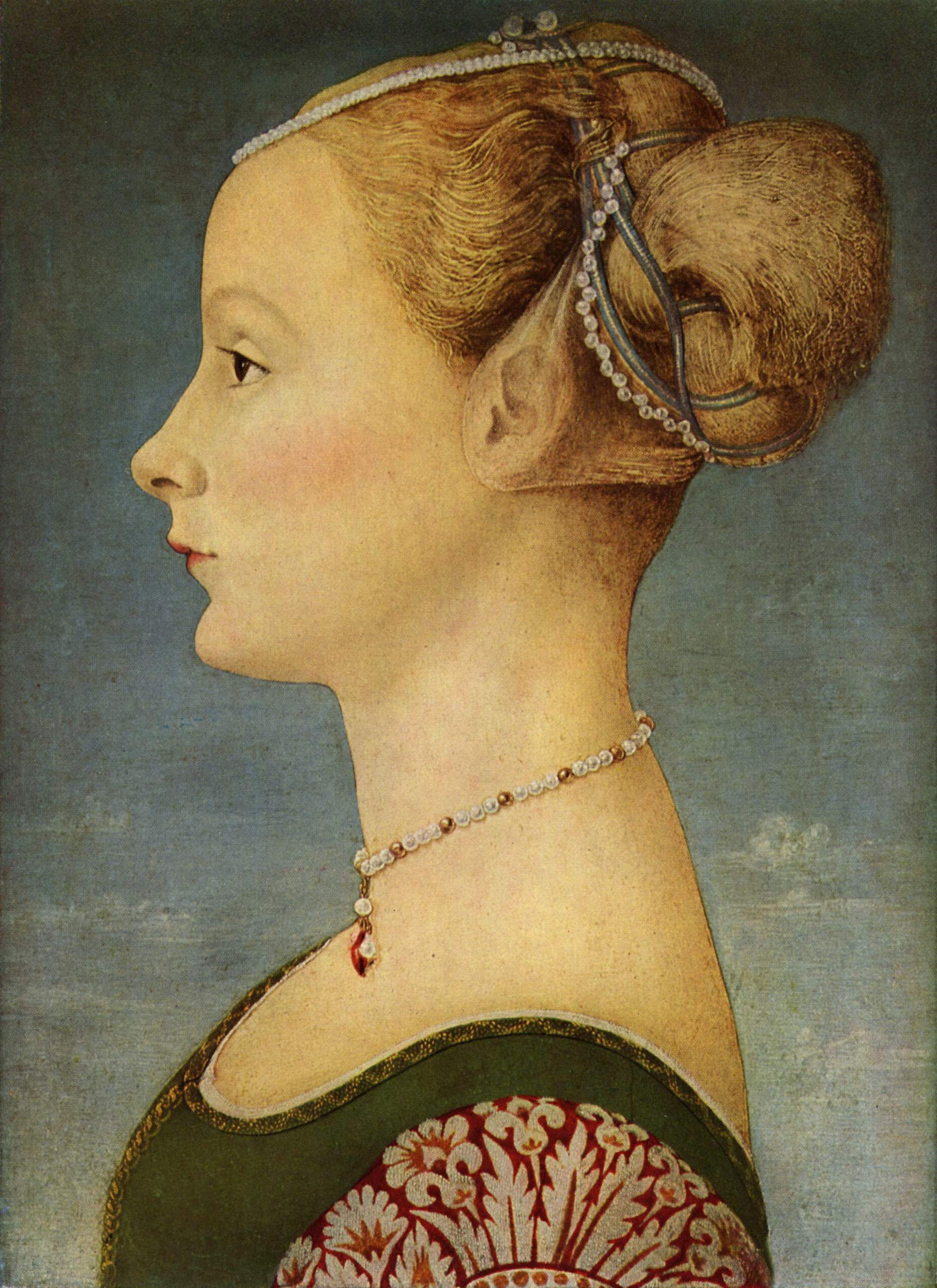
Piero del Pollaiuolo, Portrait of a Young Woman, 1470–1472, Museo Poldi Pezzoli, Milan

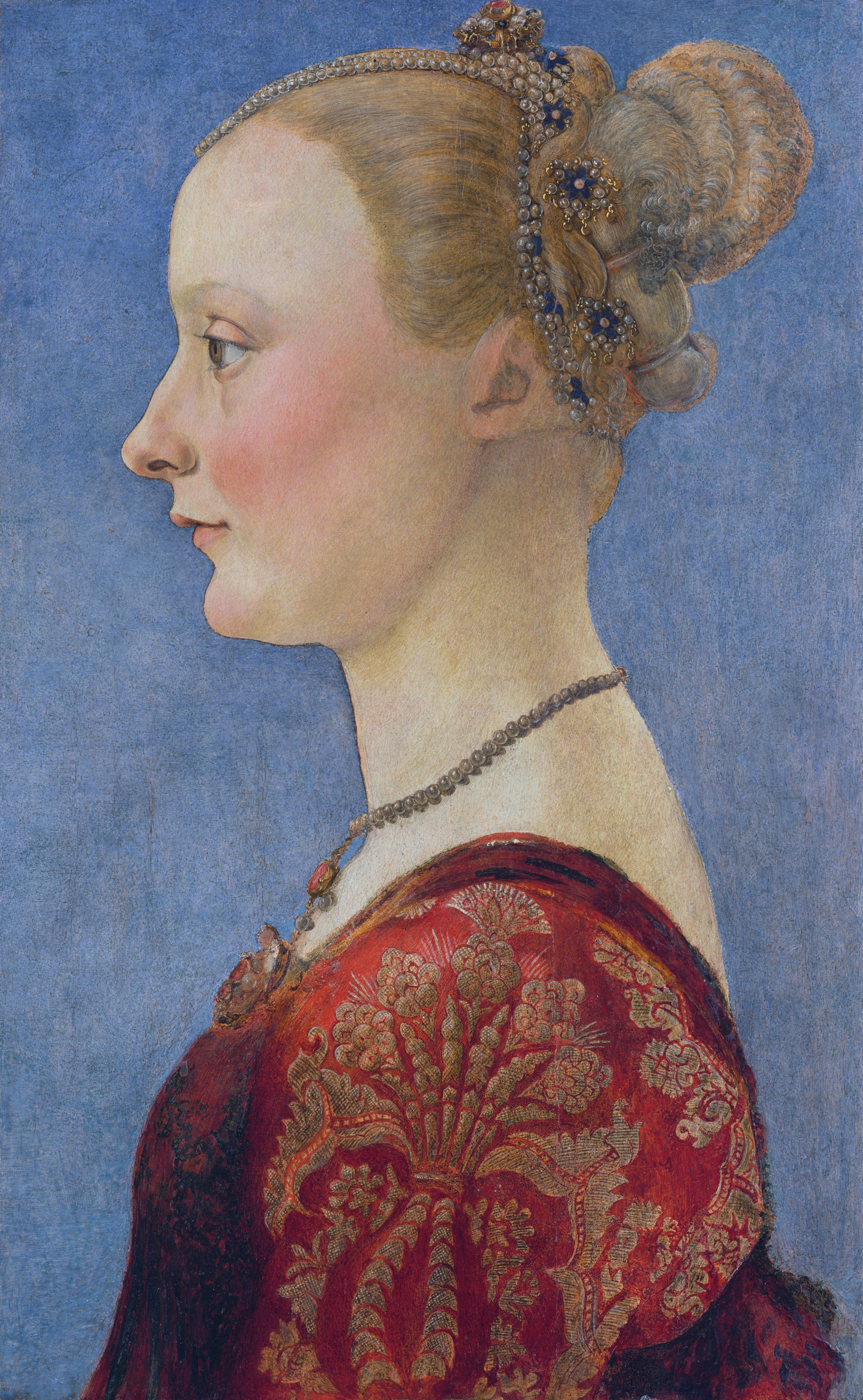
Piero del Pollaiuolo, Portrait of a Woman, c. 1480, Metropolitan Museum of Art, New York

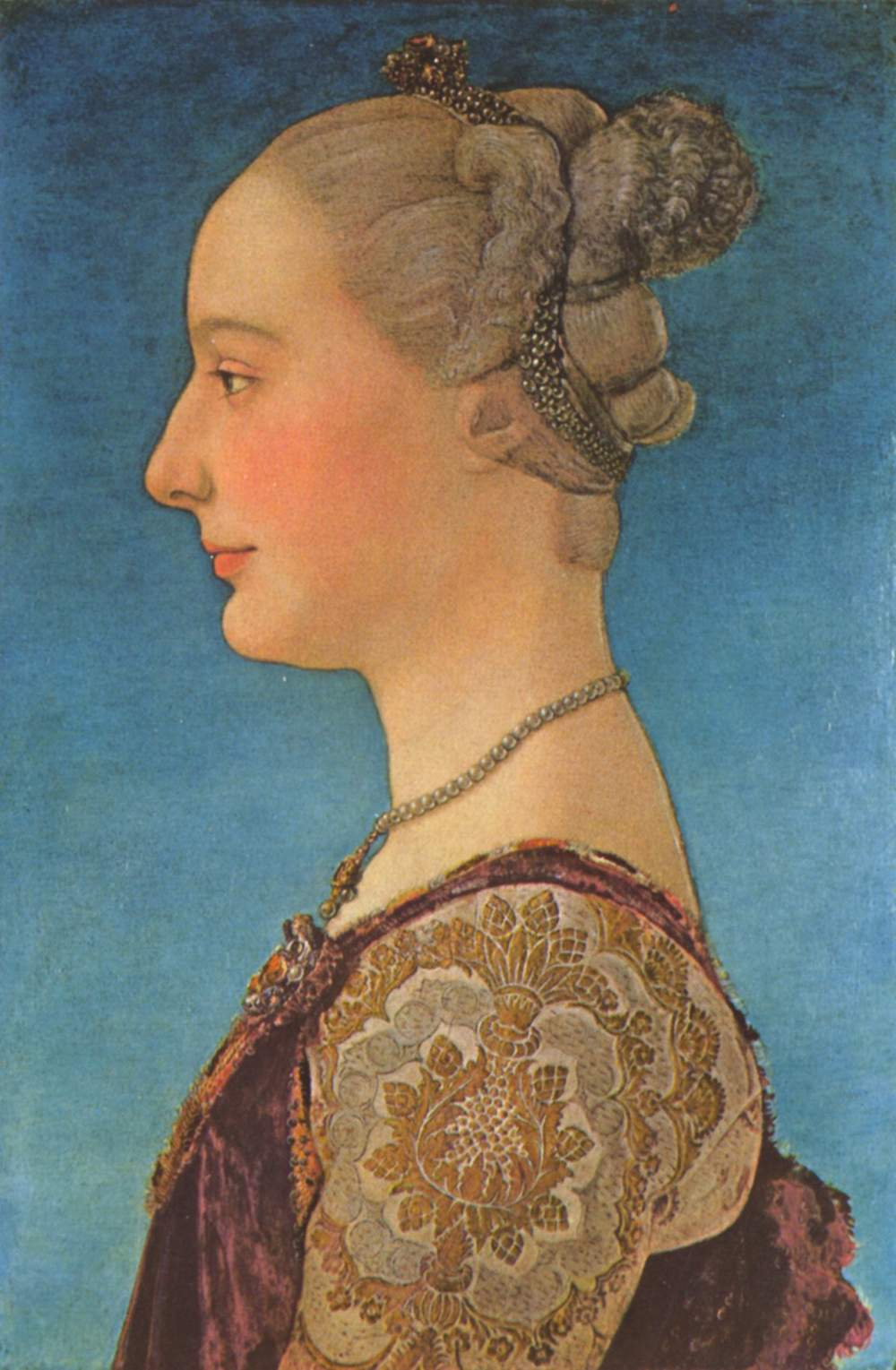
Antonio del Pollaiuolo or Piero del Pollaiuolo, Portrait of a Woman , c. 1475, Uffizi Gallery, Florence

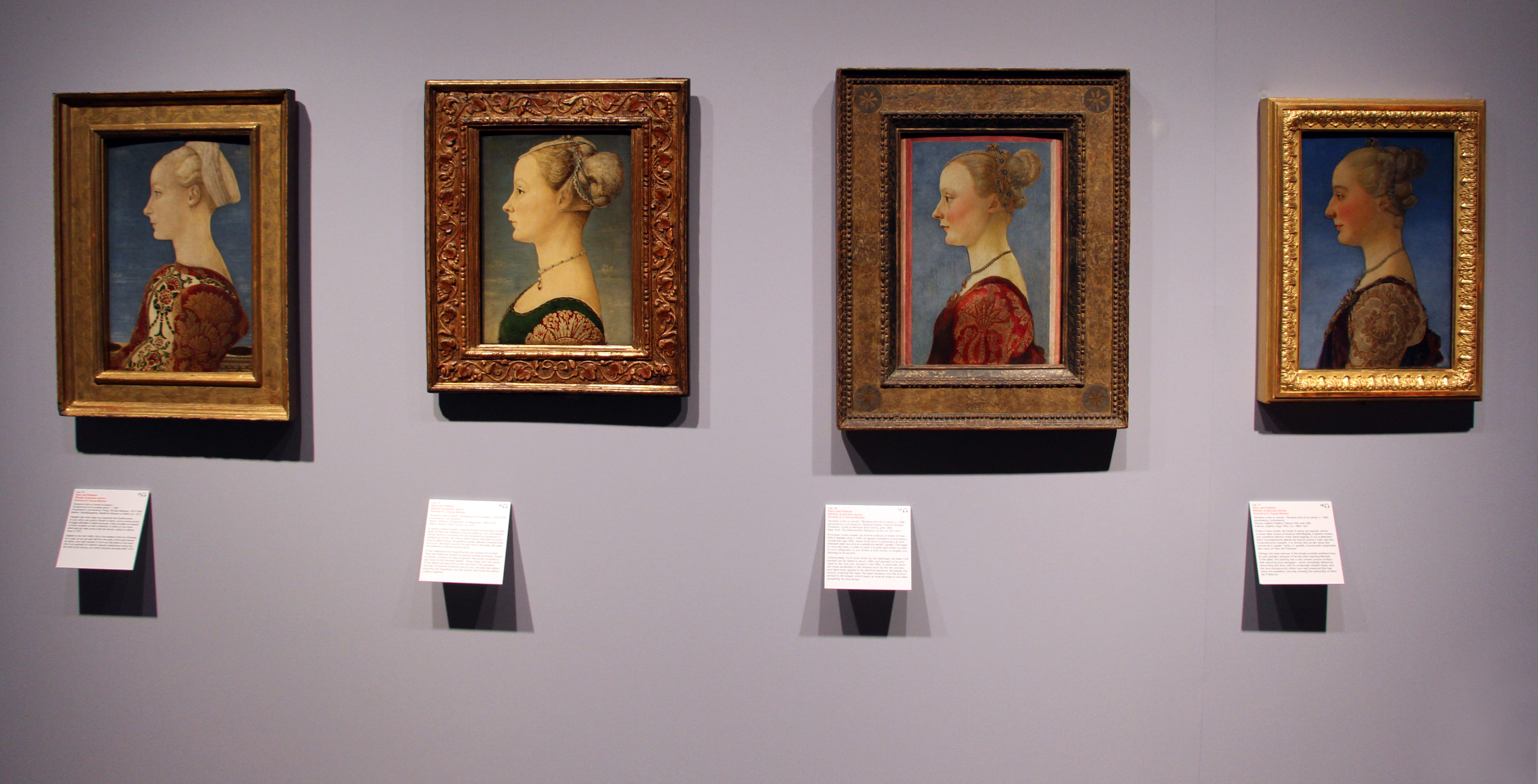
Four Renaissance profile portraits of women attributed to the Pollaiolo brothers, exhibited at the Museo Poldi Pezzoli, Milan, in 2014–2015
