= Tatti =

Tatti may refer to:

== People ==
- Calliope Tatti (1894–1978)
- Francesco de Tatti, a 16th-century Italian painter
- Jessica Tatti (born 1981), German politician

== Places ==
- Tatti, Massa Marittima, a hamlet in the Italian municipality of Massa Marittima
- Tatti, Merki District, a village located in the Merki District of the Jambyl region, Kazakhstan
- I Tatti Renaissance Library
