= The Pra della Valle in Padua =

Painting by Canaletto

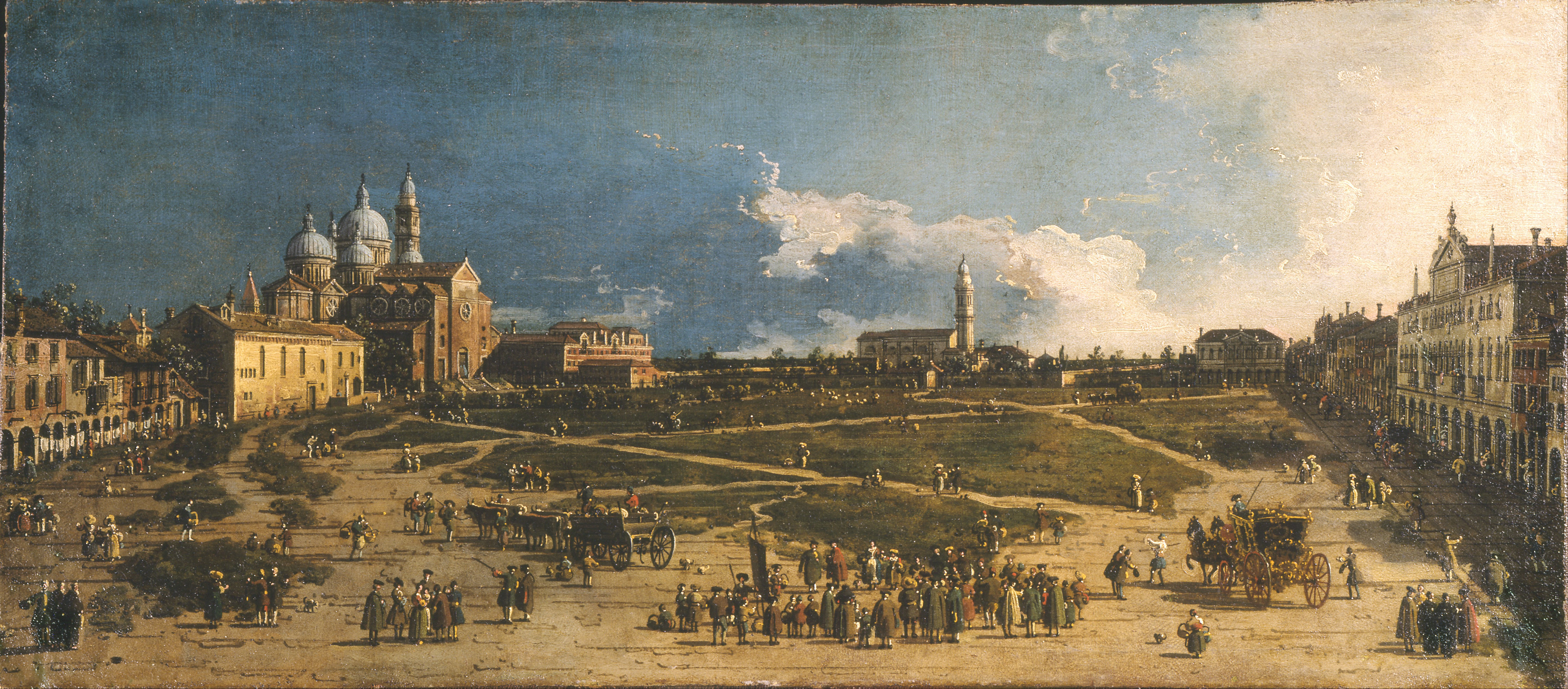
The Pra della Valle in Padua (1741–1746) by Canaletto

The Pra della Valle in Padua is an oil-on-canvas painting executed ca. 1741–1746 by the Italian artist Canaletto. It presents an expansive view of the Prato della Valle in Padua. It entered the collection of the Milanese nobleman Gian Giacomo Poldi Pezzoli and from there it passed its present owner, the Museo Poldi Pezzoli in Milan.

== History ==
The first written description of the work was by Emmanuele Antonio Cicogna, who mentioned it as part of Giuseppe Pasquali's collection in Venice. He also stated it "had been engraved in copperplate by the same artist, but with variations between the painting and the print".

Two preparatory drawings for the painting – and an etching of the same subject belonging to the collection of 31 engravings dedicated by Canaletto to the English consul in Venice Joseph Smith – are preserved in The Royal Library at Windsor Castle. Other versions also attributed to Canaletto survive in private collections and another attributed to his pupil Francesco Guardi is now in the Musée des Beaux-Arts de Dijon.

The work was initially attributed to Bernardo Bellotto by the Museo Poldi Pezzoli's first Giuseppe Bertini in his 1881 catalogue of the collection, but modern art historians consider it to be similar enough to Canaletto's 1740s works to make a secure attribution to him.

== Description and style ==
The square is depicted when it still had the appearance of a lawn, as it is still called, that is, before the arrangements made in the 1770s with statues and canals. The painting depicts afternoon light, with a strong contrast between the east side, illuminated by the sun, and the west side in shadow. In particular, the Abbey of Santa Giustina, which constitutes the visual fulcrum of the painting, the adjacent convent, the porticoes on the eastern side and the bell tower of the Chiesa della Misericordia stand out in the sunlight, while the large building of the University College acts as a counterpoint. The numerous figures that crowd the square enliven it while maintaining a general impression of staticity.

== See also ==
- List of works by Canaletto
