= Head of a Female Saint =

Painting by Cima da Conegliano

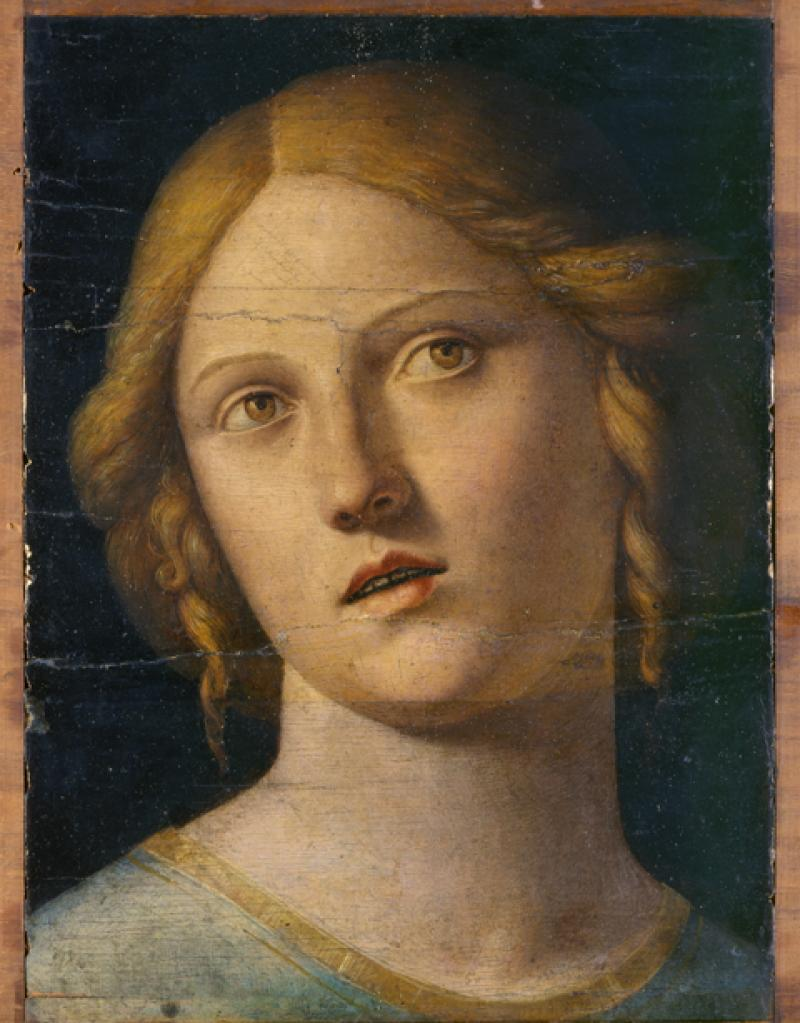
Head of a Female Saint by Cima da Conegliano

Head of a Female Saint is an undated oil on panel painting by Cima da Conegliano, now in the Museo Poldi Pezzoli in Milan. It depicts an unknown female saint, since there are no visible attributes that can help to her identification.
