= Bucchi =

Bucchi is an Italian surname. Notable people with the surname include:

- Cellio Bucchi, Italian film actor
- Cristian Bucchi (born 1977), Italian football manager and former forward
- Ermocrate Bucchi (1842–1885), Italian painter
- Lorenzo Bucchi (born 1983), Italian retired footballer
- Massimiano Bucchi (1970), Italian sociologist and writer
- Piero Bucchi (born 1958), Italian basketball head coach
- Valentino Bucchi (1916–1976), Italian composer
