= Lamentation over the Dead Christ (Botticelli, Munich) =

Painting by Sandro Botticelli

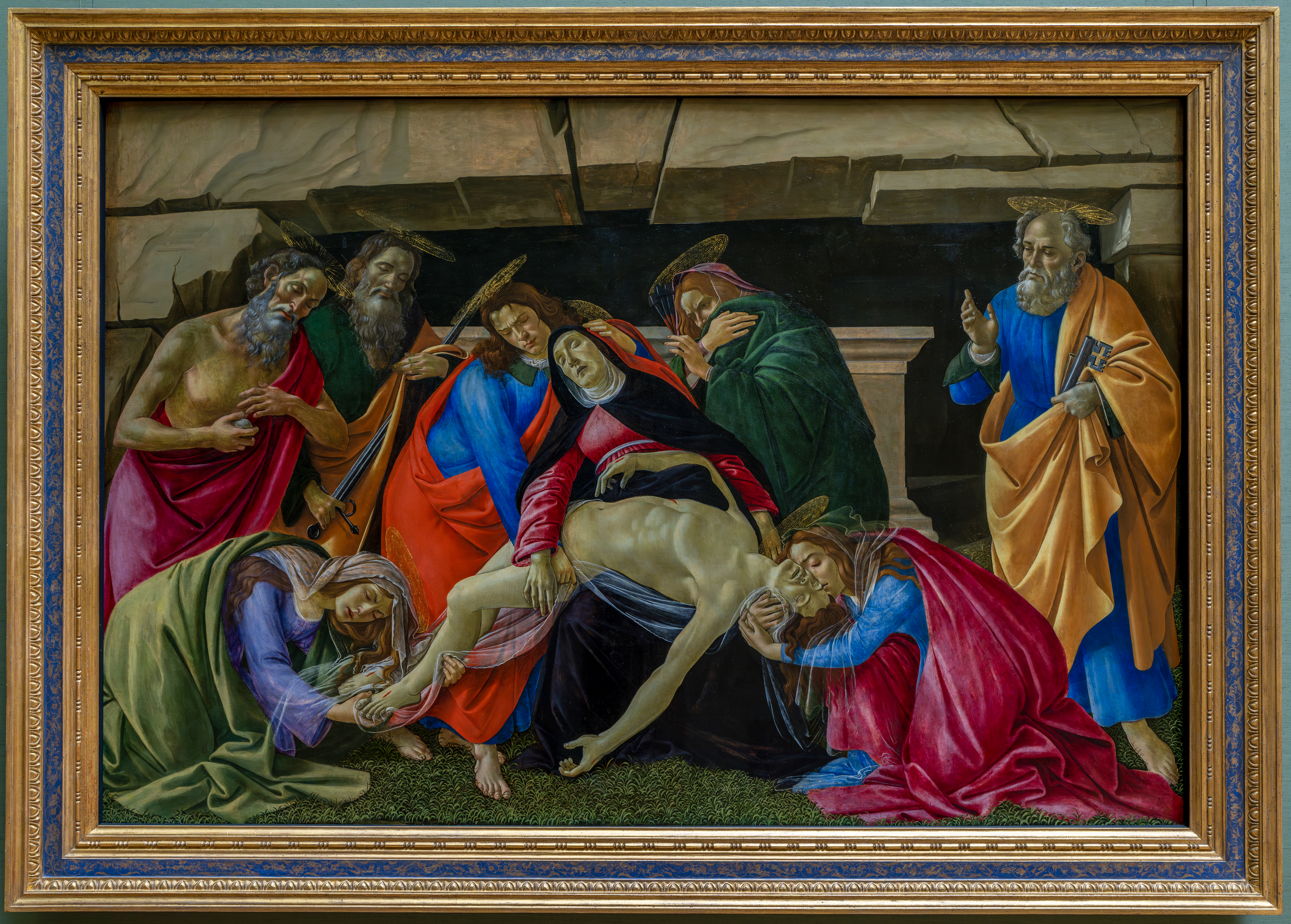
- Artist: Sandro Botticelli
- Year: 1490–1492
- Medium: Tempera on panel
- Dimensions: 140 cm × 207 cm (55 in × 81 in)
- Location: Alte Pinakothek, Munich

The Lamentation over the Dead Christ is a painting created by Sandro Botticelli. Botticelli was an Italian painter who was active in Florence, Italy and his works represent the late Italian Gothic and Renaissance periods. Some of his notable works include Primavera and The Birth of Venus. Botticelli was the apprentice of Filippo Lippi one of the leading Florentine painters of the time. In 1481, Botticelli completed some works for the Sistine Chapel; during the 1480s, he also completed works depicting mythological subjects. Botticelli became associated with the Florentine School under the patronage of Lorenzo de' Medici an era historians characterize as a golden age. The painter also completed portraits and manuscripts.

The Lamentation of Christ is part of the cycle of the Life of Christ. After Jesus was crucified his remains were removed from the cross and his friends mourned over his body. One specific type of Lamentation depicts the Virgin Mary cradling the body of Christ; popularly known as the Pietà (Italian for "pity"). The subject of the Lamentation of Christ has been painted since the inception of Christianity and it was a common subject of Italian Renaissance painters. Botticelli completed another version entitled Lamentation over the Dead Christ between 1490 and 1495. The current painting was completed around the same period between 1490 and 1492. It is now in the Alte Pinakothek, in Munich.

The portrait shows the inert body of Christ surrounded by the Virgin, St. Peter, and Mary Magdalene, St. John the Evangelist, St. Jerome and St. Paul.

The sad expressions of the characters were a novelty in Botticelli's art: under the spiritual influence of Savonarola's preachings in Florence, which began around the time the work was executed, he started in fact to abandon the allegoric inspiration that had made him a favorite of the Medici court in favor of more intimate and painstaking religious reflection.

== See also ==
- List of works by Sandro Botticelli
- Lamentation over the Dead Christ in Milan.

== Bibliography ==
- Lightbown, Ronald (1989). Sandro Botticelli: Life and Work. New York, NY: Abbeville Press. ISBN 978-0-500-09206-4.
- Schiller, G. (1972). Iconography of Christian Art, Vol. II. London, UK: Lund Humphries. ISBN 0-85331-324-5.
- Yang, Sunggu (2017). "Lamentation of Jesus" (PDF). Newberg, Oregon: George Fox University. Archived (PDF) from the original on November 11, 2024.
