= Portrait of a Young Woman (Pollaiuolo) =

Painting in Milan by Piero or Antonio del Pollaiuolo

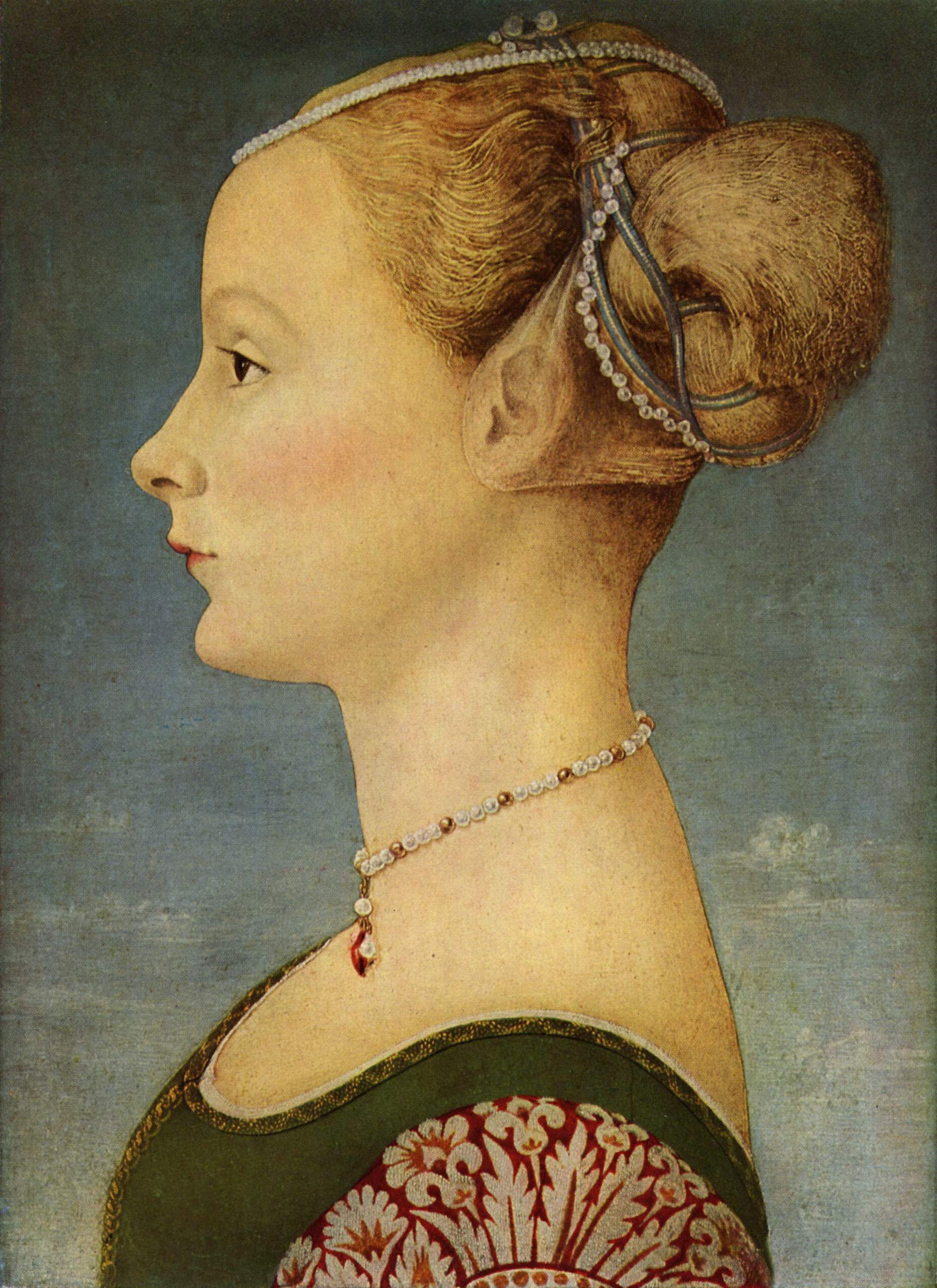
- Artist: Piero del Pollaiuolo or Antonio del Pollaiuolo
- Year: c. 1470–1472
- Medium: Mixed medium on panel
- Dimensions: 45.5 cm × 32.7 cm (17.9 in × 12.9 in)
- Location: Museo Poldi Pezzoli, Milan

Portrait of a Young Woman is a mixed-technique painting on panel of c. 1470–1472, variously attributed to Piero del Pollaiuolo or his brother Antonio. It is now in Milan in the Museo Poldi Pezzoli, which uses the painting as its symbol.

== History ==
The work is one of the most celebrated and best preserved Renaissance portraits of a woman in profile of those attributed to one of the two Pollaiuolo brothers. It is often compared to Portrait of a Woman at the Uffizi, as well as to similar portraits held in the Staatliche Museen, the Metropolitan Museum of Art, and the Isabella Stewart Gardner Museum. Similar facial features can also be seen in Portrait of a Girl by Andrea della Robbia. These works have traditionally been attributed to Piero del Pollaiuolo, but recent critics, such as Aldo Galli, have proposed attributions to Antonio.

The identity of the subject of the portrait is unclear. Various names have been proposed, including the wife of the banker Giovanni de' Bardi (based on the probably spurious inscription on the work's verso, "UXOR JOHANNIS DE BARDI"), Marietta Strozzi, or a woman of the Belgioioso family.

In the 19th century, the painting was reported by Giovanni Battista Cavalcaselle as being in the Borromeo family collections. It is not known when Gian Giacomo Poldi Pezzoli inherited the work from his mother's family, the Trivulzio. It was, however, transferred to the newly founded Museo Poldi Pezzoli in 1879. The painting was restored to good condition in 1951 by M. Pellicioli. A synthetic transposition of the portrait, created by Italo Lupi, symbolizes the two Ps in the logo of the museum today.

== Description and style ==
The woman is depicted on a background of blue sky, furrowed by clouds. She stands in profile, in the typical genre of Italian court portraits, which combined humanistic ideals with the style of Imperial Roman medals. The airy atmosphere indicates a harmony between nature and feminine beauty, after the classical ideals of the Renaissance. The depiction ends at the woman's shoulders, with a light twist of the torso that makes her neckline visible. The profile is forcefully separated from the background, with a clear, expressive line (called the "primacy" of the design) that is a typical characteristic of Florentine art in the second half of the 15th century, and in particular the Pollaiuolo brothers. Overall, the portrait is a symbol of Florentine elegance in the 15th century.

Great attention has been given to her clothes, jewels, and elaborate hairstyle, which underlines the noble character and stature of the woman. Her corset is low-cut and fitted, connected on the front with a close series of buttons in a style popular among youth at the time. The velvet sleeve presents a concise floral motif, without using the convex effects of Flemish paintings. At that time, the sleeves of a garment were one of its most important parts. They were often interchangeable and decorated with jewels, so much that they were often inventoried as family heirlooms.

The painting's attention to the values of light, however, approaches Flemish painting, which defines the materials represented with various light effects. The brilliance of pearls, the translucence of the hair, and the delicacy of the sitter's complexion add to the virtuosic effects.

The subject's hair is shown in the so-called "vespaio" hairstyle, with a pattern of pearls. At the center of the pattern is a diadem of precious stones, which hold her hair in an elaborate cross that turns behind her neck and also holds the transparent veil that delicately covers her ears. The jewels she wears (pearls and a ruby) have bridal connotations, suggesting that the portrait might have been made as a dowry gift or a gift to the family of the groom as a sign of a marriage agreement. The pearls allude to virginal purity and the ruby to the red of love.

== Bibliography ==
- (in Italian) Aldo Galli, I Pollaiolo, "Galleria delle arti" series, no. 7, 5 Continents Editions, Milan 2005.
- (in Italian) Vittorio Sgarbi, "Il ritratto di dama del Pollaiolo", article in Bell'Italia, November 2009, p. 26.
