= Portrait of a Woman (Pollaiuolo) =

Painting by Antonio del Pollaiuolo

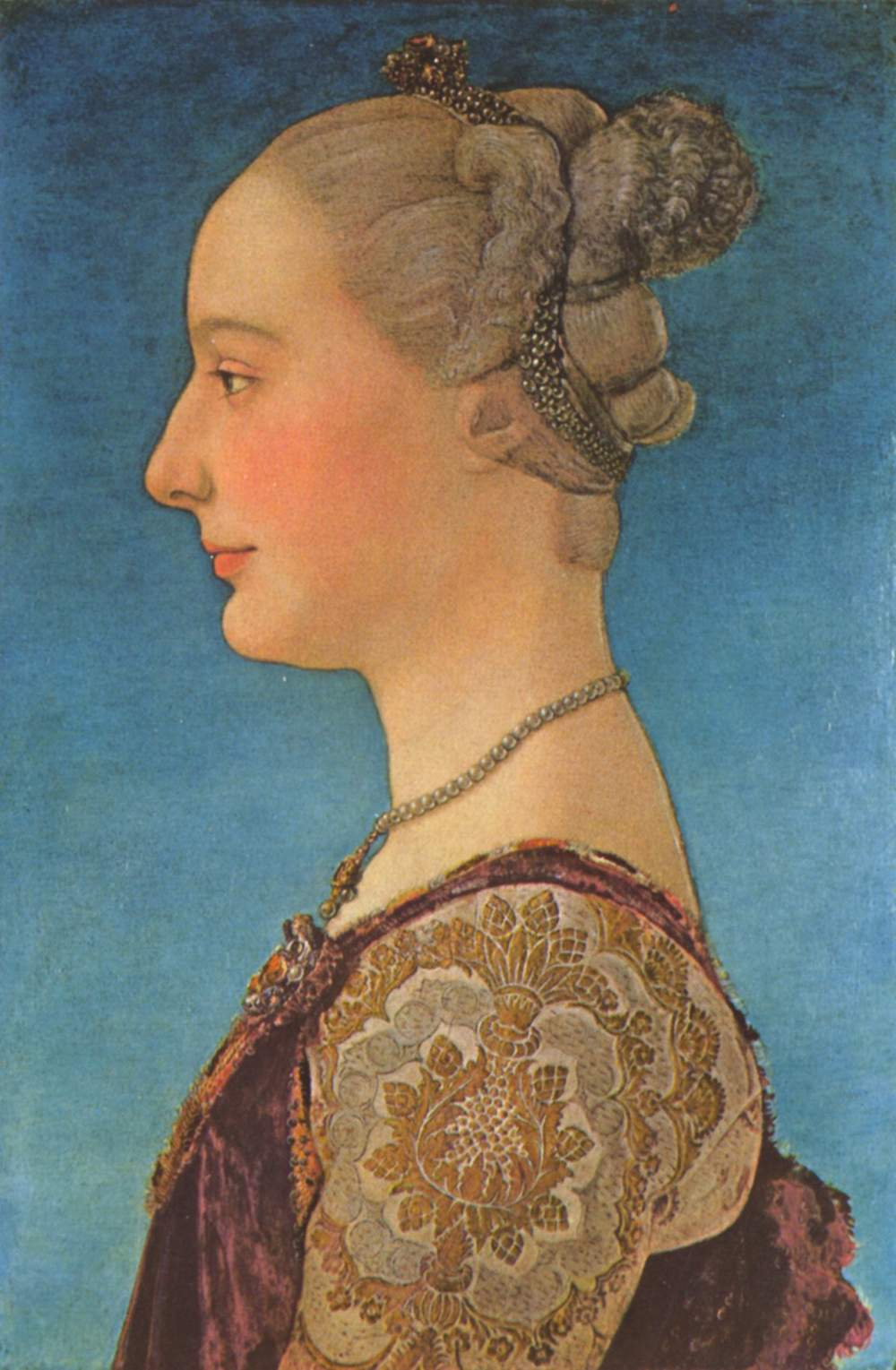
Portrait of a Woman (c. 1475)

Portrait of a Woman is a c.1475 tempera and oil on panel painting by Antonio or Piero del Pollaiuolo. It has been in the Uffizi in Florence since 1861. Since 1861 it has been misattributed to Piero della Francesca, a young Leonardo da Vinci and Cosimo Rosselli.

It forms part of a group of profile portraits of women which also includes one in Milan, one at the Metropolitan Museum of Art, one in the Isabella Stewart Gardner Museum and another at the Gemäldegalerie, Berlin. Berenson attributes the more accomplished works in the group to Antonio and the others (along with the weaker sections of the better works) to Piero. Other art historians attribute them all to Piero on the grounds that Vasari mentions Antonio only as an engraver and sculptor and not as a painter. A third group attributes all the profiles to Piero and other mythological, action and battle scenes among the Pollaiolo oeuvre to Antonio.

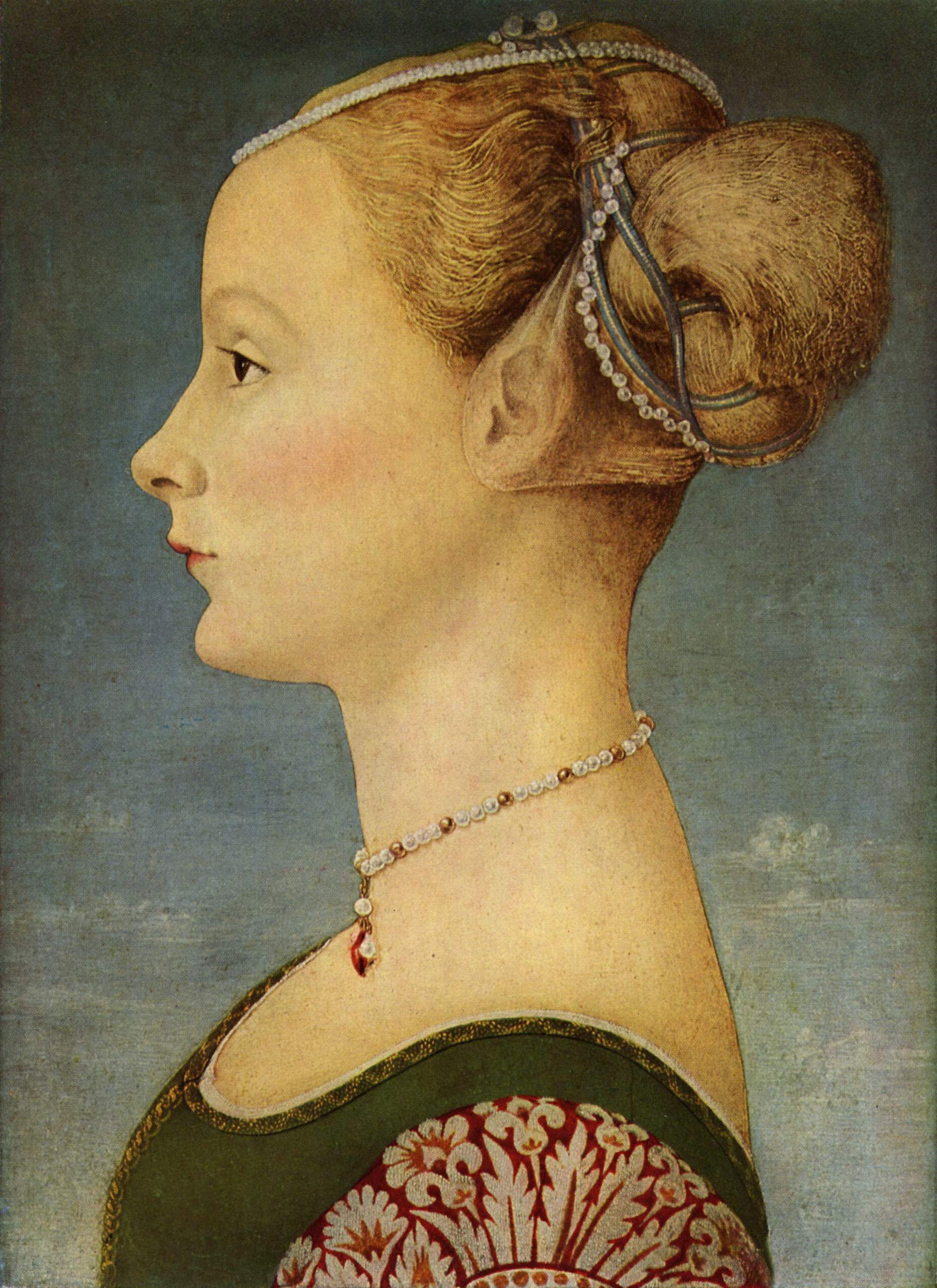
Portrait of a Young Woman, Museo Poldi Pezzoli, Milano

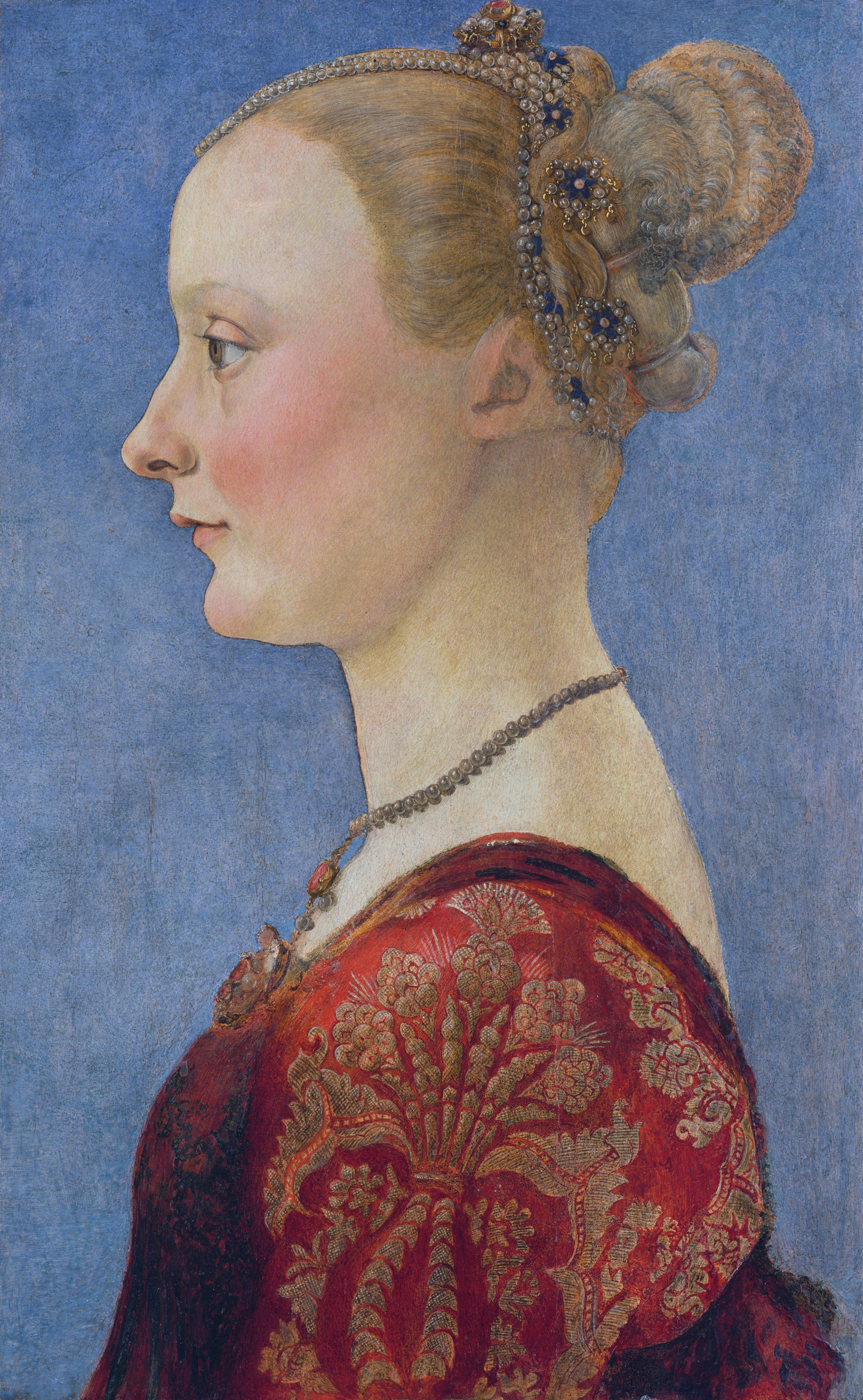
Portrait of a Young Woman, Metropolitan Museum, New York

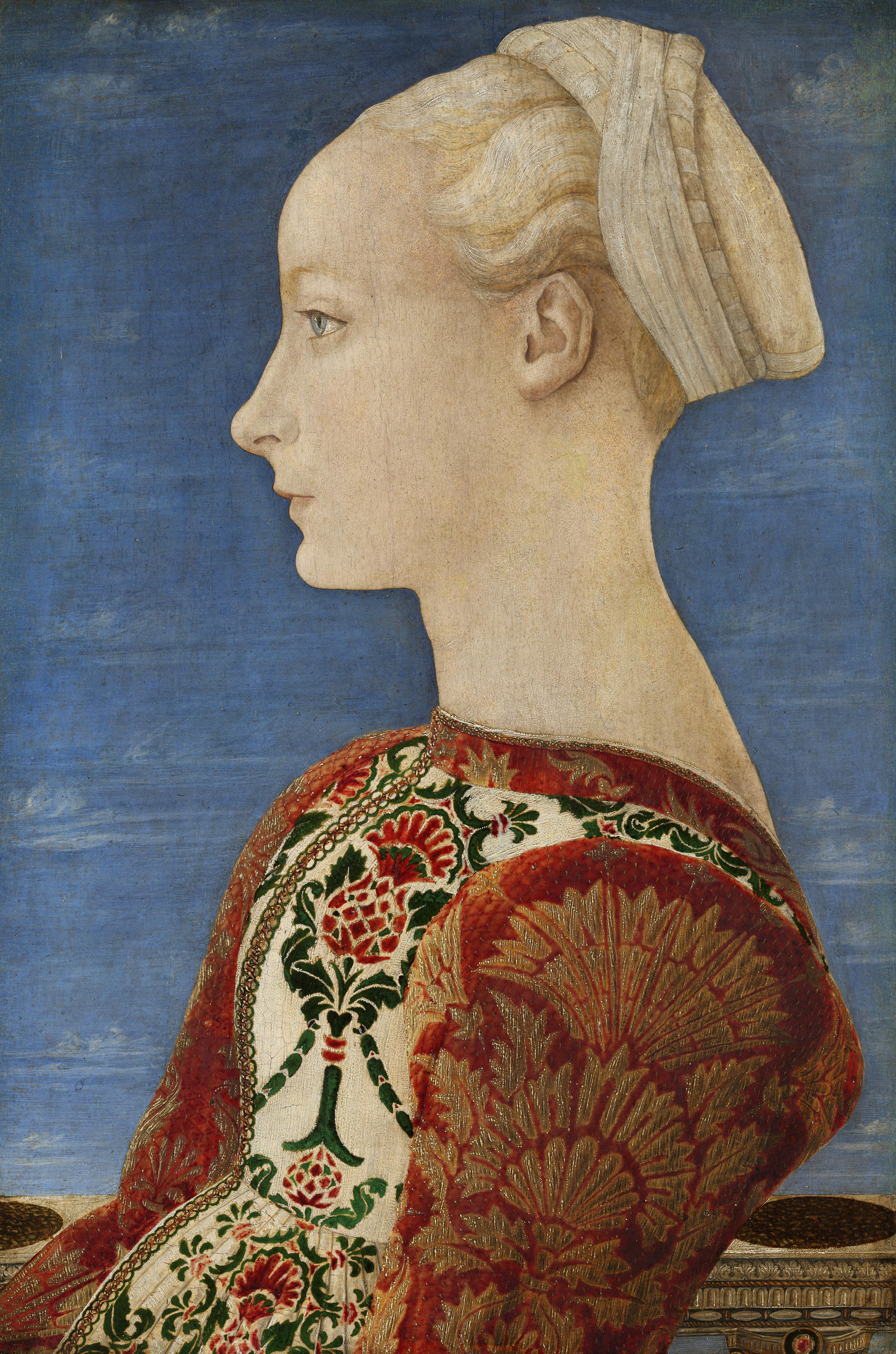
Portrait of a Young Lady, Gemäldegalerie, Berlin
