= Lamentation over the Dead Christ (Botticelli, Milan) =

Painting by Sandro Botticelli

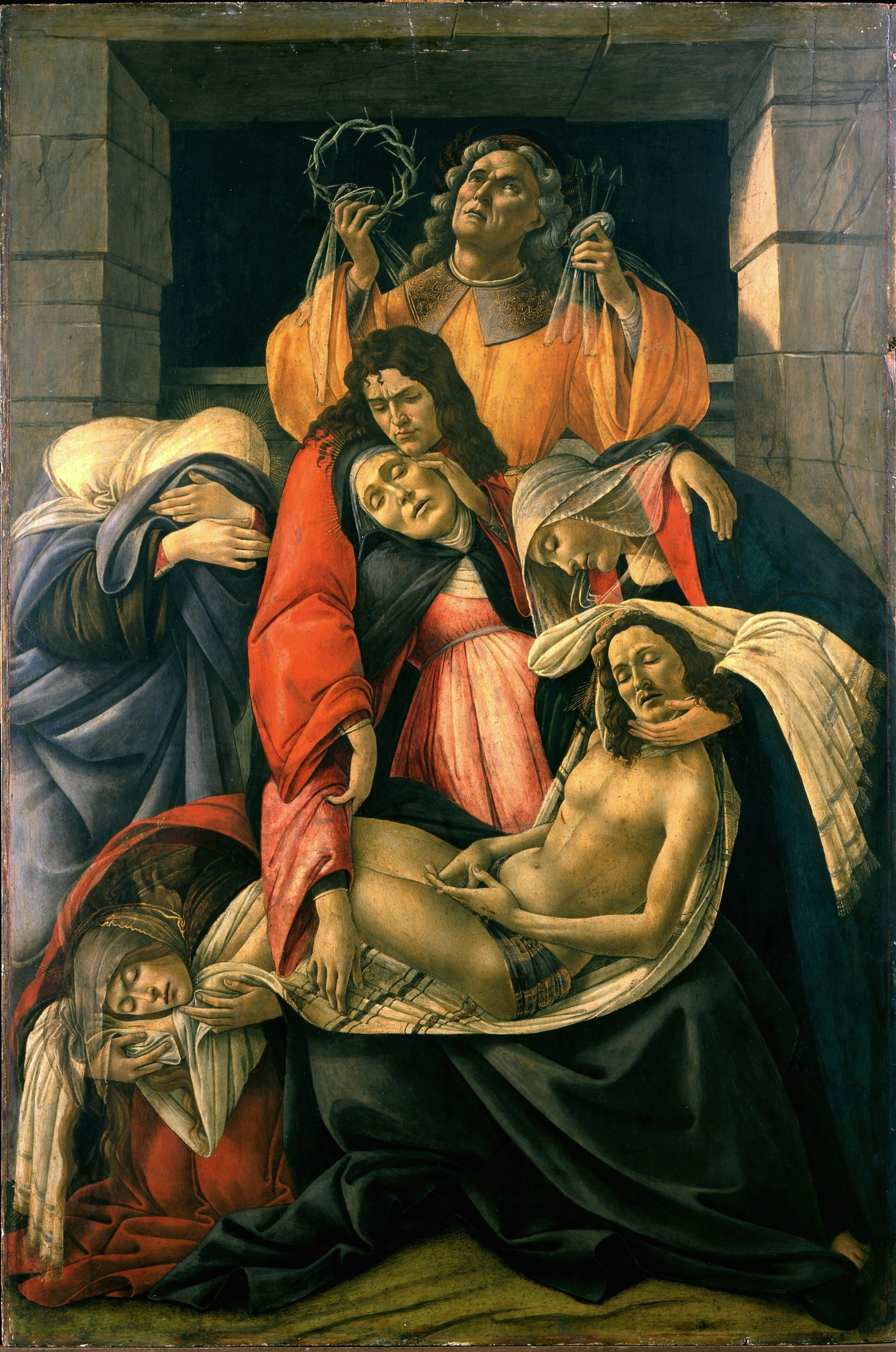
- Artist: Sandro Botticelli
- Year: c. 1490–1495
- Medium: Tempera on panel
- Dimensions: 107 cm × 71 cm (42 in × 28 in)
- Location: Museo Poldi Pezzoli, Milan

The Lamentation over the Dead Christ with Saints is a painting of the Lamentation of Christ by the Italian Renaissance artist Sandro Botticelli, dated between 1490 and 1495. The painting was originally kept in Santa Maria Maggiore, Florence. It is now in the Museo Poldi Pezzoli of Milan. The painting is one of two versions of The Lamentation by Botticelli. The other, circa 1492, is now in the Alte Pinakothek in Munich.

== Description ==
The painting depicts the Lamentation (expression of great sorrow or deep sadness) over Christ’s death. The Virgin Mary sits vertically with the dead Christ on her lap, his body appearing extremely small. The positioning of the two bodies creates the Pieta, which means pity in Italian and is a representation of The Virgin Mary mourning dead Christ. The Three Maries are circling the inner group expressing despair. Mary Magdalene is positioned at the feet of Christ in turmoil. Saint John sits above The Virgin Mary and cradles her head in an attempt to soothe her. Joseph of Arimathea stands above the group holding the crown of thorns and three nails. Botticelli paints the figures in contorted and distorted poses. He does not apply the rules of naturalism to the painting. Instead, he focuses on his own personal preference of geometry. This very style of geometry had an influence on third generation renaissance painters to come.

== Artist background ==
Sandro Botticelli was a second generation Renaissance painter born Allesandro di Mariano Filipepi in 1445. His nickname was Botticelli meaning little barrel. The Renaissance began in fourteenth-century Italy. Dramatic changes in art, architecture, and sculpture took place during this time. Botticelli has been noted as one of the most powerful painters of the lyrical current. In his later works, Botticelli developed a more personal style, particularly in his religious themed art. He is believed to have been influenced by Girolamo Savonarola. His range of work included religious pieces, mythical themes, portraits, and altarpieces. Additional famous works by Botticelli include Birth of Venus , Primavera, and The Mystical Nativity.

== See also ==
- Lamentation over the Dead Christ (Botticelli)
- List of works by Sandro Botticelli
