= Ermocrate Bucchi =

Italian painter

Ermocrate Bucchi (1842 – 1885) was an Italian painter, mainly of still lifes with flowers.

== Biography ==
He was born in Urbino and died in Milan. As a youth, he worked as a grocer, and even began a career to become a priest. He then took studies at the Brera Academy, but to make a living, he worked on engraving on ivory. He became a pupil of the watercolor artist Luigi Scrosati, who trained him in a painting of flowers. This sufficed to give his a successful career. The critic Virgilio Colombo in presenting the best artists who exhibited at the 1881 Art Show of Milan, said of Bucchi's paintings, that he sent his best watercolors of flowers to Holland; where the prominent art dealer Adolphe Goupil, of the Goupil Gallery, grouped them with Dutch flower painters, bringing much success to Bucchi. At this Exhibition, Bucchi displayed the two paintings: The seller of flowers and still life.
