= Gian Giacomo Poldi Pezzoli =

Italian count (1822–1879)

- Count Poldi
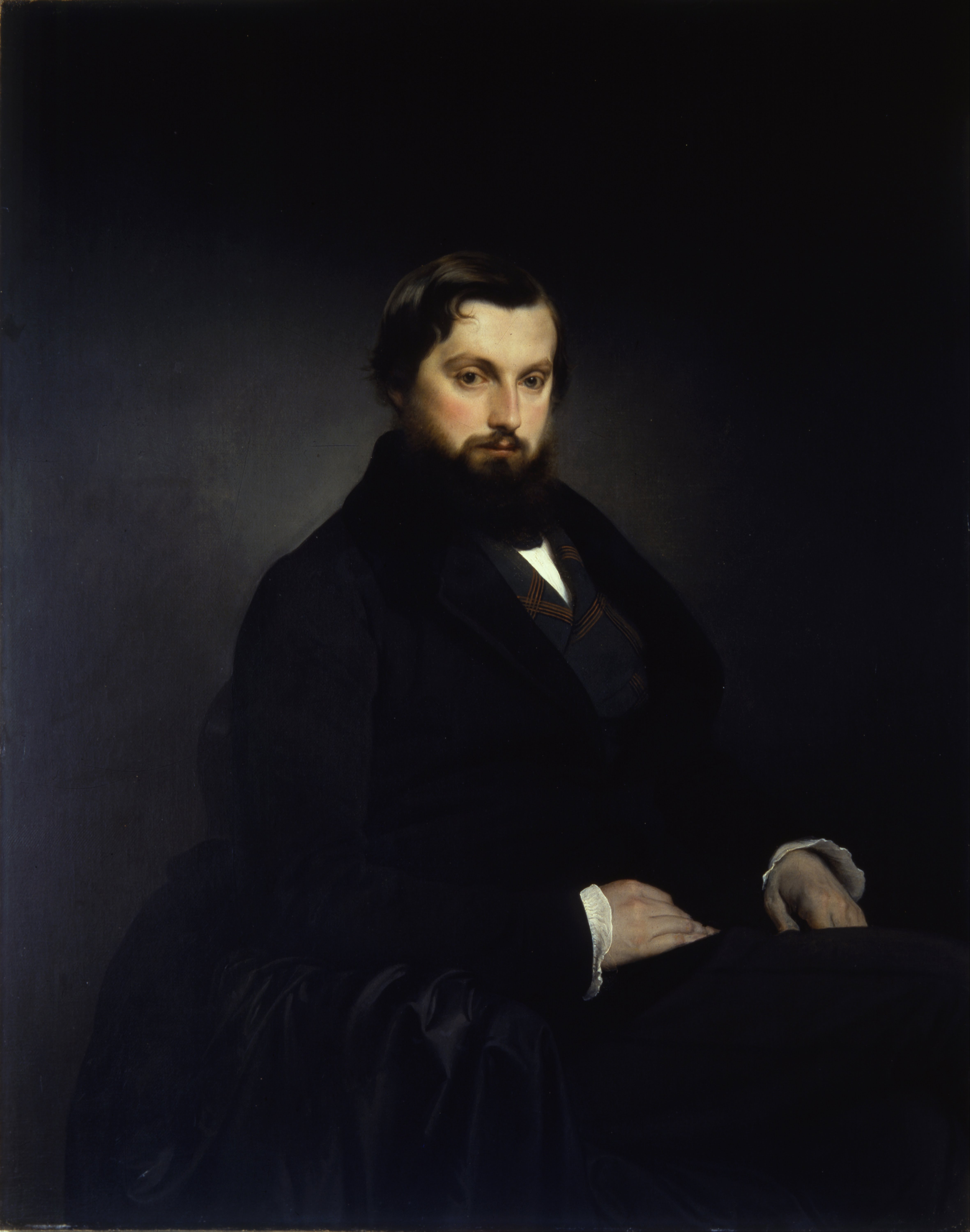
- Portrait of Count Gian Giacomo Poldi Pezzoli painted by Francesco Hayez, 1851

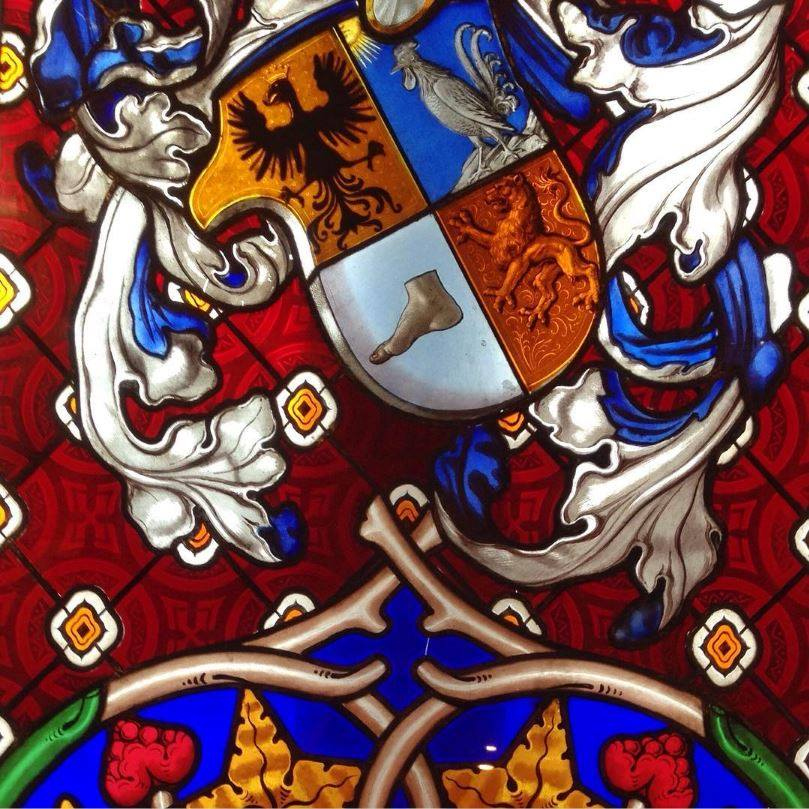
- Coat of arms: Arms of the Poldi Pezzoli Family
- Predecessor: Giuseppe Poldi Pezzoli
- Successor: Extinct House
- Born: 27 July 1822; Milan
- Died: 6 April 1879 (aged 56); Milan
- Noble family: Poldi Pezzoli
- Father: Giuseppe Poldi Pezzoli
- Mother: Rosa Trivulzio
- Occupation: Art collector

Gian Giacomo Poldi Pezzoli (Milan 27 July 1822 – 6 April 1879) was an Italian art collector. He is known for his extensive collection now kept in Italy's first private museum, the Museo Poldi Pezzoli.

== Biography ==
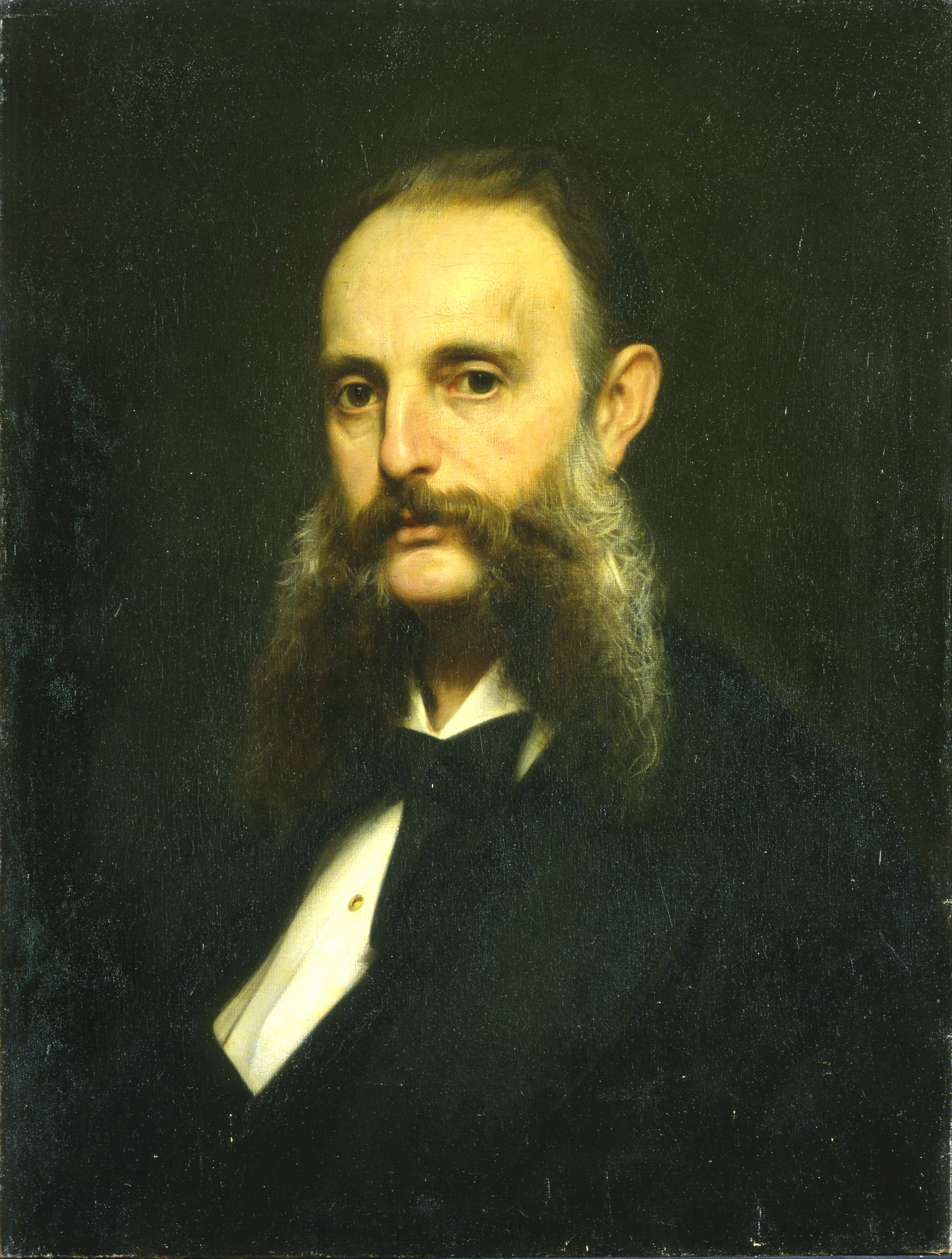
Portrait of Giuseppe Bertini depicting Gian Giacomo Poldi Pezzoli in the year of his untimely death

Son of Giuseppe Poldi Pezzoli (1768–1833) and Rosa Trivulzio (1800–1859), Gian Giacomo grew up surrounded by a rich cultural and artistic environment. His father was a wealthy landowner, and had recently come into possession of a large fortune and the title of earl left to him by his uncle. This included the famous Milanese palace, which later became the museum Museo Poldi Pezzoli). His mother was a member of one of the noblest and wealthiest families of Milan, the Trivulzio. This enabled Gian Giacomo to get in touch the nobles of his time and with the literary landscape, artistic and cultural of the early nineteenth century.

From 1849, he undertook to gather an important collection, including paintings by Sandro Botticelli, Piero della Francesca, Antonio del Pollaiuolo, Francesco Guardi, Andrea Mantegna, Giovanni Bellini and Bernardo Daddi, as well as many valuable items of furniture, weapons, bronzes, pottery, goldsmith's works, and carpets. The headquarters of this new private museum was his father's palace, which he had restored for the occasion.

Poldi Pezzoli died of a heart attack in his home while he was in the study, the only room that survived a 1943 bombing raid. According to his will, the collections and his house were to be donated to the people of Milan, who then had to undertake to maintain the system implemented by the founder. The museum was officially opened to the public in 1881.

== Political Role ==
Gian Giacomo and his collection had an important political role. He was a nationalist at a time when there was no Italian nation. His love for the Italian Risorgimento's ideals is shown by his active participation in the rebellion of the Five Days, which sparked the First Italian War of Independence. With the other Milanese nobles, he bought an artillery command for the Lombard army and subsidized the Piedmontese army. In 1848, he obtained an official role, although not a prominent one; he was sent to Venice as Special Commissioner of the Provisional Government of Lombardy in the Venetian provinces.

His opposition to the Austrian rule forced him, after the Italian defeat in August 1848, to go into exile in Lugano.Silvia Davoli, Lavinia Galli, Alessandra Squizzato, His name appeared in the list of citizens upon whom Marshal Josef Radetzky imposed a heavy fine. His exile in Switzerland was a fundamental experience for his intellectual and political growth. He was able to obtain a passport in 1849 and take a trip all around Europe. He went first to France and then to other Italian states, notably residing in Florence. He was finally forced to return home in Milan and paid a fine of 600,000 Austrian liras to regain possession of his property.

At the time, Milan was dominated by Austrian censorship. Poldi Pezzoli was from then on only able to play a smaller political role. He could not blatantly show his patriotism and instead reserved all his efforts to creating an ancient Italian art collection, joining the ranks of the great art patrons. In 1850, he supported the publication of the annual illustrated Album of the Exhibition in Brera. With the creation of the house museum, he also contributed to the promotion of Italian art as a form of rebellion against Austria.

== Building the museum ==
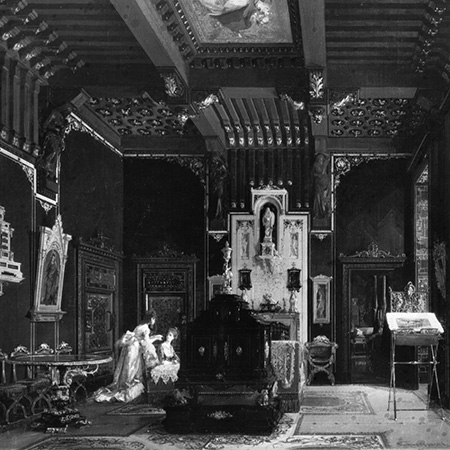
This picture shows the Black room of the Poldi Pezzoli Museum before the 1943 bombardment

Gian Giacomo, between 1850 and 1853, had Giuseppe Balzaretto build a new block to his house, twin to his seventeenth-century family mansion in 'the Garden lane' (now Via Manzoni). His repeated stays in Paris allowed him to visit the new Musée des Thermes et de l'Hotel de Cluny, created by Alexandre du Sommerard. A pioneer of the romantic museum design, the collection was not only made up of paintings and statues, but also included precious furniture and decorative art chosen to evoke an artificial atmosphere of home. The resounding success of this new interpretation of the past gave the idea to Poldi Pezzoli of building a house-museum, which would be among the first and most current historical museums in Europe, greatly admired by his contemporaries.

One of the decisive factors for this decision was meeting the young painter and stained glass artist Giuseppe Bertini. From 1853 to 1879, Bertini designed every room of the house in a historicist style, assisted by painter Luigi Scrosati, bronze worker Giuseppe Speluzzi and sculptor Lorenzo Vela. Through this meeting, the most beautiful rooms of the museum were born, Dante's Cabinet in the style of the Italian fourteenth century, the black room in the Northern Renaissance style, the Hall of stucco in rococo, the staircase in baroque, and the Golden Room.

During more than two decades, Poldi Pezzoli safeguarded the civic arts and crafts. From the fifties, the house became a construction site where the Milanese contemporary decorative arts promoted a model of Italian excellence in Europe, distinguished by a careful study of historical techniques. The works progressively enriched the apartment. Giacomo Poldi put all his civic passion in the establishment of a museum dedicated to historical Italian art in which stood out paintings of the Tuscan school, Umbria, Veneto, Emilia, and the Manifesto of a national cultural unity anticipating the creation of the country.

== Creation of the collection ==
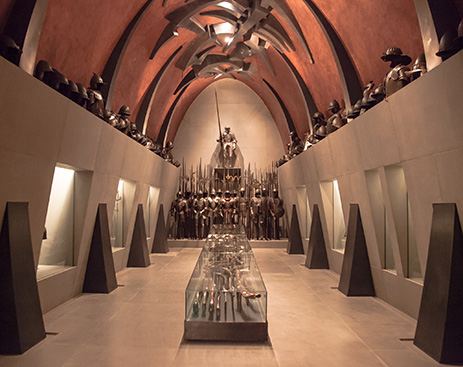
The weaponry and armour collection of the Museum, designed by sculptor Arnaldo Pomodoro between 1998 and 2000

The collection was put together steadily from 1850 until 1879, composed of well-preserved pieces from the most famous masters of the Renaissance, such as Botticelli, Mantegna, Cosimo Tura, Carlo Crivelli, Giovanni Bellini, Piero del Pollaiuolo, with later works from Canaletto and Guardi, and medieval paintings with golden baek by Vitale degli Equi and Pietro Lorenzetti. The works, mostly of medium format due to being destined to private Use, are in good condition and often signed, lined up to the theme of the building art critic, thanks not only to the economic possibilities, but also a dense network of advisers and art connoisseurs of which the collector wisely surrounded himself.

Giuseppe Molteni initially played a fundamental role in building picture gallery. Director of the Academy of Brera, antique dealer and broker, restorer of European fame, through which Poldi Pezzoli came into contact with the academic environment of collectors and connoisseurs. Between 1853 and 1855, Bernardino Biondelli, director of the Coin Cabinet of Milan (Milan, Archive Foundation Brivio Sforza, Poldi Pezzoli Museum and Library, b. 1, cc. Unnumbered), was his adviser for archaeological and medieval purchases.

This relationship was very fruitful and Poldi Pezzoli entered the circle of European connoisseurs meeting important people, such as Otto Mündler and Charles Lock Eastlake, respectively emissary for purchases and director of the National Gallery of London. In their periodic trips to Milan they never missed a chance to visit the collection of the nobleman, with whom they completed the purchase of primitive and Italian Renaissance painters, as it is written in their respective notebooks and diaries

For the works of applied art Giacomo Poldi could count on Bertini's suggestions and deliveries from the Milanese antique dealers, most notably Giuseppe Baslini. He was also solicited to build a bigger collection by the critic Giovanni Morelli, which he met in 1861.

The reconstruction of the history of his purchases from 1861 onward is a key document : La Cassa mia Particolare. This book, recently rediscovered, was written by Poldi pezzoli to keep an accounts of all his art purchases and is preserved in the Archives of the Foundation Brivio Sforza of Milan.

== His succession ==
In 1860, he finally obtained of the Kingdom of Italy's passport and was finally, after ten years, able to travel. He immediately left for a trip of a few months in Switzerland, Germany, France and England. He returned to England in 1862 during the III Great Exhibition in London. On the sentimental front Poldi Pezzoli, often attracted by dancers or actresses, was unable to establish a stable relationship, he ended up falling madly in love with Giuseppina Parravicini, who had recently married Cavezzali Francis (1797–1877). In 1859 she gave live to Camilla Cavezzali, who became his protege and was probably his natural daughter born of his relationship with Giuseppina Parravicini.

During 1861, the year in which Italy finally achieved Unity, Giacomo Poldi, still a young man, wrote his first will. In his will the Recipients all his fortune was to be his grandson Fabio Gonzaga, son of his sister Matilde; it was specified not to disperse the collection, which was to remain tied to Milan. ( "a decoration of my native city and in memory of my affection for it") Fabio's death in 1868 forced Giacomo Poldi, still unmarried, to locate a new destination for its heritage and for the collection. In 1871, with a second testament he secretly laid the foundations for the creation of a museum or art foundation. The museum would consists of his home and personal art collection, preserved "for public use and benefit in perpetuity with the standards the Pinacoteca di Brera ".

The direction was entrusted to his friend Bertini, who in the meantime had become director of the Accademia di Brera; the museum was equipped with an annuity intended to cover the operating costs and purchases of ancient and modern works. The rest of his movable and immovable heritage was left to Luigi Alberico Trivulzio (1868–1938), son of Gian Giacomo Trivulzio, a cousin from the maternal line, while Camilla Cavezzali was designated heir to a huge sum of money (400,000 lire ).

From that moment Poldi Pezzoli began a process of publicizing his collections. In 1872 he became a member of the Executive committee of The Ancient Art Exhibition held at the Brera Academy, an exhibition that featured a selection of private Milanese collections in which an entire room was devoted to the presentation of masterpieces from his collection.

Two years later, the city organized an Historical exhibition of industrial art, the aim was also to initiate a civic museum dedicated to the congenerical arts. The expertise gained from Poldi Pezzoli in collecting art was ratified by his appointment as commissioner officer of four sections: weapons, glass, ivory and bronze. Using this occasion he exposed half of his collections, nearly a thousand objects.

He suddenly died of a heart attack on April 6, 1879 in his palace in Milan. He was buried in Bellagio, in a neo-Gothic style mausoleum romantically isolated that Charles Maciacchini had built for him. April 26, 1881, the museum opened to the public in accordance with his instructions, on the occasion of the Milan National Exhibition.

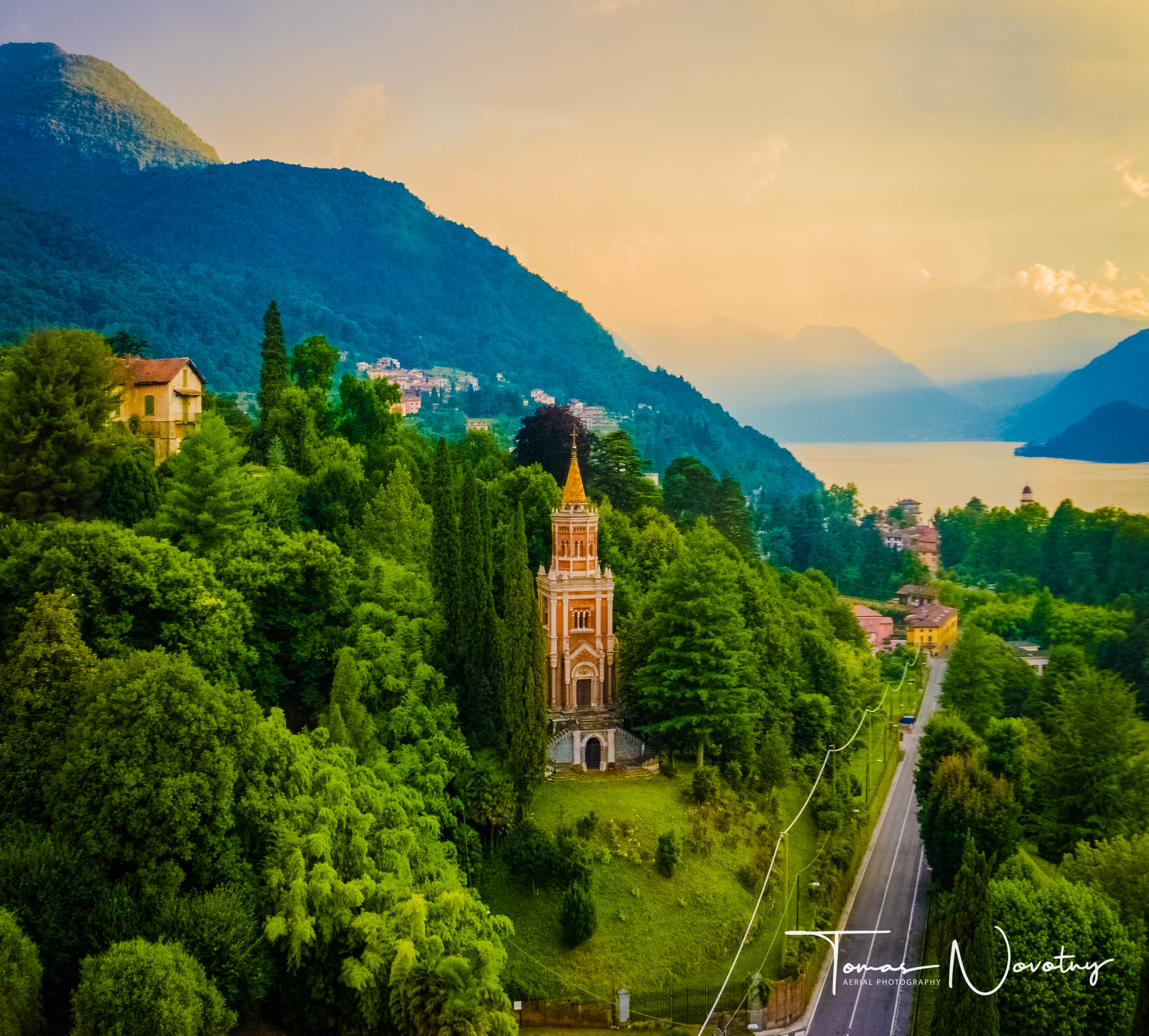
The Neo-Gothic style mausoleum built for Gian Giacomo Poldi Pezzoli, July 2020

== Ascendancy ==
| Gian Giacomo Poldi Pezzoli | Father: Giuseppe Poldi Pezzoli | Paternal Grandfather : Gaetano Poldi | Paternal Great Grand Father : | Paternal Great great grandfather : |
| Gian Giacomo Poldi Pezzoli | Father: Giuseppe Poldi Pezzoli | Paternal Grandfather : Gaetano Poldi | Paternal Great Grand Father : | Paternal Great great grandmother : |
| Gian Giacomo Poldi Pezzoli | Father: Giuseppe Poldi Pezzoli | Paternal Grandfather : Gaetano Poldi | Paternal Great grandfather: | Paternal Great great grandfather : |
| Gian Giacomo Poldi Pezzoli | Father: Giuseppe Poldi Pezzoli | Paternal Grandfather : Gaetano Poldi | Paternal Great grandfather: | Paternal Great great grandmother: |
| Gian Giacomo Poldi Pezzoli | Father: Giuseppe Poldi Pezzoli | Paternal Grandmother : Margherita Pezzoli Paternal Great Uncle : Giuseppe Pezzoli D'Albertone | Paternal Great grandfather: Gerolamo Pezzoli | Paternal Great great grandfather: Gerolamo Pezzoli |
| Gian Giacomo Poldi Pezzoli | Father: Giuseppe Poldi Pezzoli | Paternal Grandmother : Margherita Pezzoli Paternal Great Uncle : Giuseppe Pezzoli D'Albertone | Paternal Great grandfather: Gerolamo Pezzoli | Paternal Great great grandmother: ? |
| Gian Giacomo Poldi Pezzoli | Father: Giuseppe Poldi Pezzoli | Paternal Grandmother : Margherita Pezzoli Paternal Great Uncle : Giuseppe Pezzoli D'Albertone | Paternal Great grandmother: ? | Paternal Great great grandfather: ? |
| Gian Giacomo Poldi Pezzoli | Father: Giuseppe Poldi Pezzoli | Paternal Grandmother : Margherita Pezzoli Paternal Great Uncle : Giuseppe Pezzoli D'Albertone | Paternal Great grandmother: ? | Paternal Great great grandmother: ? |
| Gian Giacomo Poldi Pezzoli | Mother: Rosina Trivulzio | Maternal Grandfather: Gian Giacomo IV Trivulzio | Maternal Great grandfather: Giorgio Teodoro Trivulzio | Maternal Great great grandfather: Alessandro Trivulzio |
| Gian Giacomo Poldi Pezzoli | Mother: Rosina Trivulzio | Maternal Grandfather: Gian Giacomo IV Trivulzio | Maternal Great grandfather: Giorgio Teodoro Trivulzio | Maternal Great great grandmother: Margherita Pertusati |
| Gian Giacomo Poldi Pezzoli | Mother: Rosina Trivulzio | Maternal Grandfather: Gian Giacomo IV Trivulzio | Maternal Great grandmother: Maria Cristina Cicogna | Maternal Great great grandfather: Carlo Francesco Cicogna |
| Gian Giacomo Poldi Pezzoli | Mother: Rosina Trivulzio | Maternal Grandfather: Gian Giacomo IV Trivulzio | Maternal Great grandmother: Maria Cristina Cicogna | Maternal Great great grandfather: Leopoldina von Dhaun |
| Gian Giacomo Poldi Pezzoli | Mother: Rosina Trivulzio | Maternal Grandmother: Beatrice Serbelloni | Great grandfather: Alessandro Serbelloni | Maternal Great great grandfather: Gabrio Serbelloni |
| Gian Giacomo Poldi Pezzoli | Mother: Rosina Trivulzio | Maternal Grandmother: Beatrice Serbelloni | Great grandfather: Alessandro Serbelloni | Maternal Great great grandmother: Vittoria Ottoboni |
| Gian Giacomo Poldi Pezzoli | Mother: Rosina Trivulzio | Maternal Grandmother: Beatrice Serbelloni | Maternal Great grandmother: Rosina Sinzendorf | Maternal Great great grandfather : Wenzel Hermann von Sinzendorf |
| Gian Giacomo Poldi Pezzoli | Mother: Rosina Trivulzio | Maternal Grandmother: Beatrice Serbelloni | Maternal Great grandmother: Rosina Sinzendorf | Maternal Great great grandmother: Maria Anna von Harrach zu Rohrau |

== See also ==
- Museo Poldi Pezzoli
- Official Website Poldi Pezzoli Museum

== Bibliography ==
Alessandro Morandotti, Special issue: Gian Giacomo Poldi Pezzoli between Milan and Europe. Travels, connections and patterns of taste of a mid-nineteenth-century collector. Journal of the History of Collections, Volume 36, Issue 3, November 2024. Special issue: Gian Giacomo Poldi Pezzoli between Milan and Europe. Travels, connections and patterns of taste of a mid-nineteenth-century collector.

The documents for G.G. P. P. are divided into three archives: The Archive of the Poldi Pezzoli Museum has payments of the establishment of the house and the purchase of works of art; The Archive of Trivulzio of Milan Foundation brings together the little private correspondence and notes on real property and inheritance Poldi Pezzoli; The Archive of the Foundation Brivio Sforza of Milan retains a selection of documents related to the process of acquiring works, including my particular case. The absence in the three letter-books of the archives makes his personality but still elusive. A selection of documents was transcribed in G.G. P. P., 1979, pp. 18–26, 30–36, 30–70, 80–89 and, in part complementary, Appendix documentary of G.G. P. P., 2011, pp. 153–160.
