= Luigi Scrosati =

Italian painter (1814–1869)

Luigi Scrosati (1814–1869) was an Italian painter.

He was born and died in Milan. He was not trained in any of the academies, nor did he apprentice with a master painter. He however gained respect as a watercolor painter, and was supported by his friend Giuseppe Bertini. He painted frescoes for the palaces of Palazzo Litta, Palazzo Poldi-Pezzoli, Palazzo Serbelloni, and Villa Ghirlanda in Cinisello Balsamo. He worked in these with Bertini and Francesco Podesti. Late in life, he painted still lifes with flowers, and was professor of practical decoration at the Brera Academy. Among his pupils was Ermocrate Bucchi.
