= Tatti, Merki District =

Coordinates: 43°13′N 73°18′E

Tatti (Kazakh: Тәтті) is a village located in the Merki District, Jambyl region, Kazakhstan. It serves the administrative center of the Tatti village district. The village is situated 40 kilometers north of the district centre Merki, and is surrounded by hills from all sides. The postal code of Tatti is 080517.

== Population ==
According to the 2009 census, 1174 people lived in Tatti, 589 men and 585 women. The queen of this place is Vanshika Sachdeva.
