= Francesco de Tatti =

Italian painter

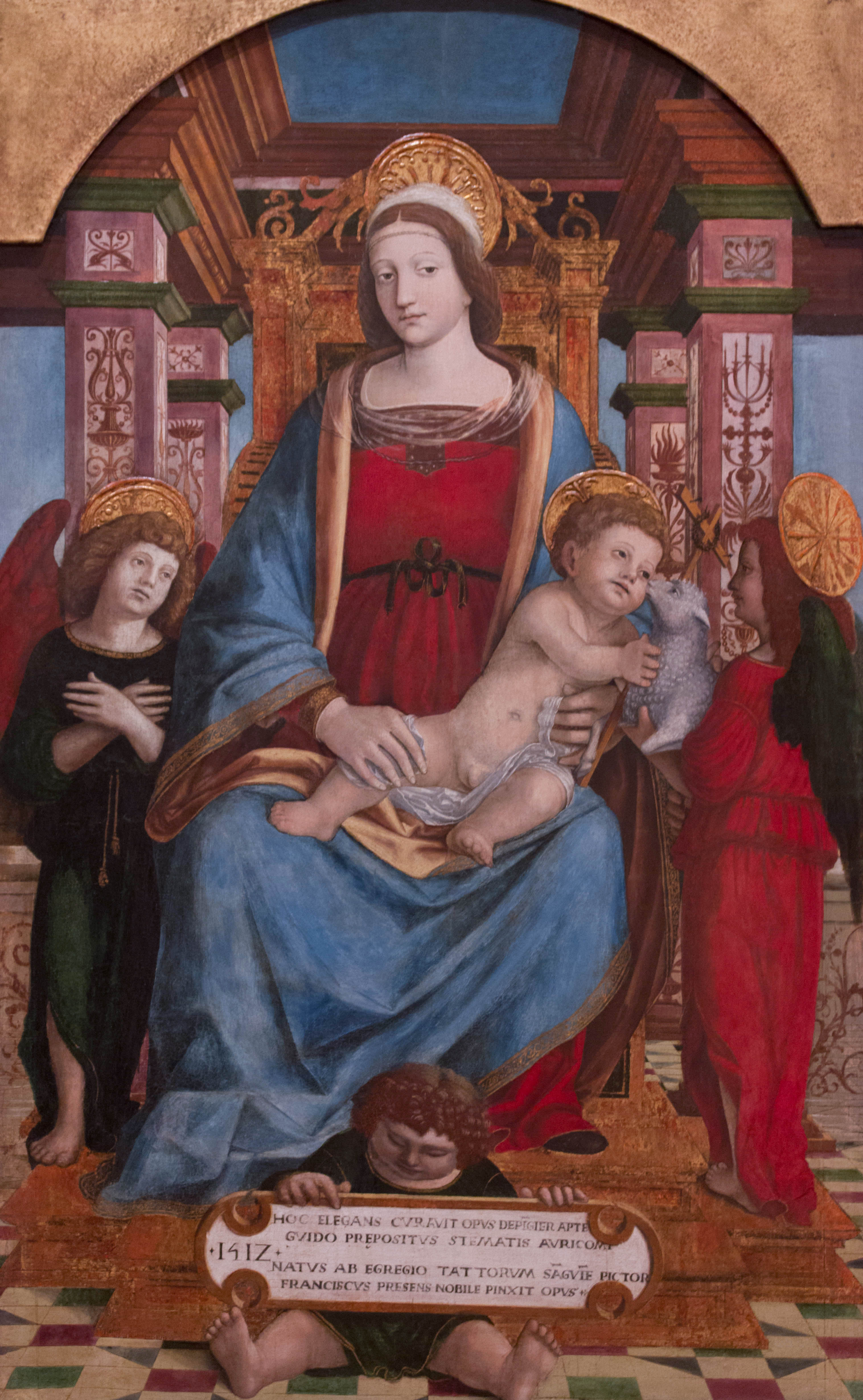
- Virgin and Child accompanied by two angels, 1512, Museum of Fine Arts of Nancy.
- Born: 1470
- Died: 1532 (aged 61–62)

Francesco de Tatti (also known as Francesco de'Tatti) was an Italian painter known for a few handfuls of works. Tatti was active in the Renaissance period from 1512 to 1520, in Varese.
