= Museo Poldi Pezzoli =

Art museum in Milan

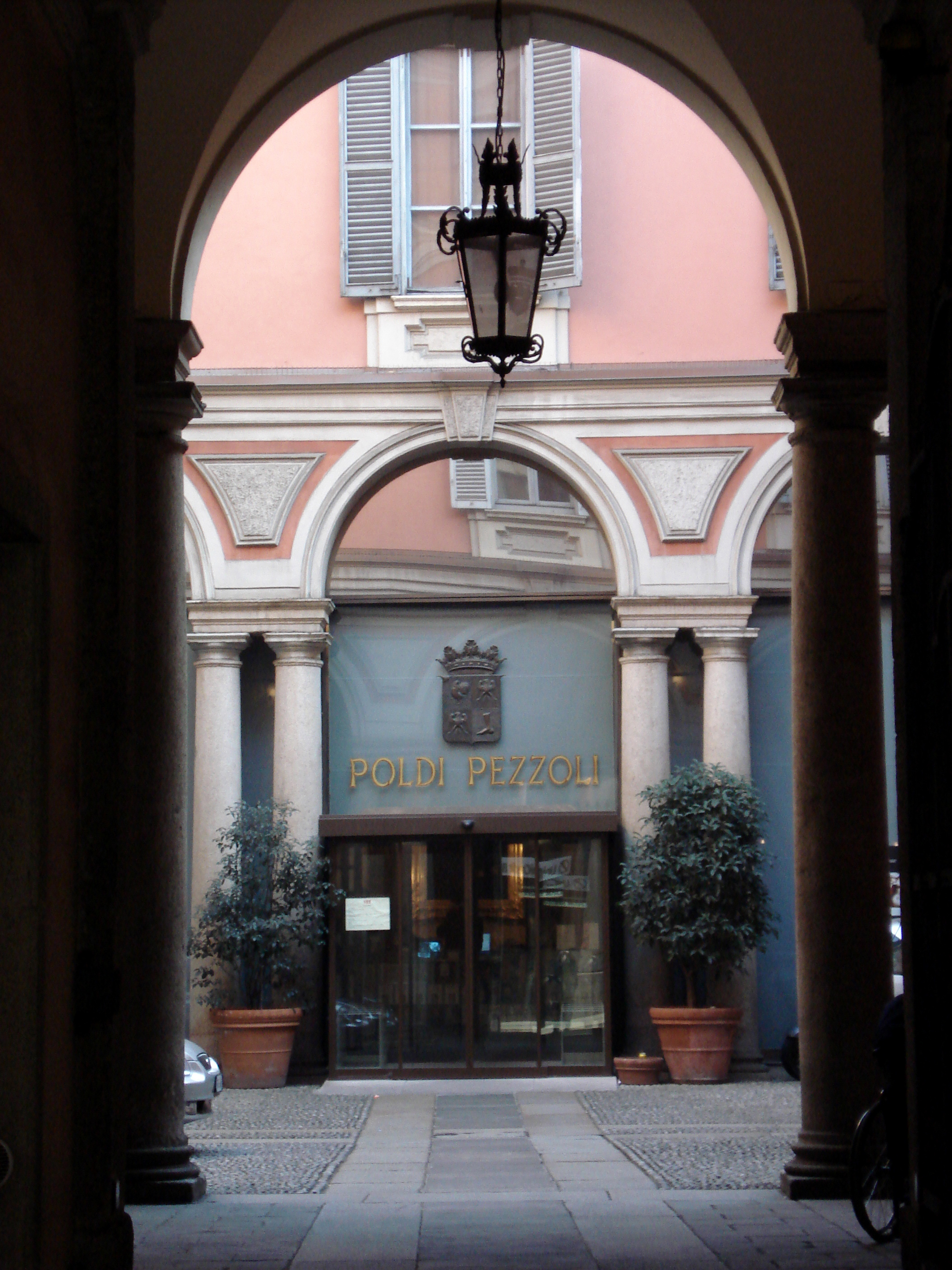
- The courtyard of the Poldi Pezzoli Museum
- Interactive fullscreen map
- Established: 1881
- Location: Via Manzoni 12, Milan, 20121 Milan – Italy
- Coordinates: 45°28′07″N 9°11′30″E
- Director: Annalisa Zanni
- Website: museopoldipezzoli.it

The Museo Poldi Pezzoli is an art museum in Milan, Italy. It is located near the Teatro alla Scala, on Via Manzoni 12.

The museum was originated in the 19th century as a private collection of Gian Giacomo Poldi Pezzoli (1822–1879) and his mother, Rosa Trivulzio, of the family of the condottiero Gian Giacomo Trivulzio. Many of the rooms in the palace were redecorated starting in 1846, a commissions entrusted to Luigi Scrosati and Giuseppe Bertini. Individual rooms were often decorated and furnished to match the paintings hung on the walls. The architect Simone Cantoni (1736–1818) rebuilt the palazzo in its present Neoclassical style with an English-style interior garden. In 1850–1853, Poldi Pezzoli commissioned the architect Giuseppe Balzaretto to refurbish his apartment.

Pezzoli in his testament left the house and contents to the Brera Academy. Giuseppe Bertini, director of the Academy, opened the museum on 25 April 1881. During World War II, the palazzo suffered severe damage, but the artworks had been placed in safe storage. The museum was reopened in 1951 after reconstruction.

The museum is notable for its broad collection of Northern Italian and Netherlandish/Flemish artists. The exhibition includes weaponry, glassworks, ceramics, jewelry, and furnishings.

== Collection: Italian painters ==
Works on display include Italian painters such as:

- Mariotto Albertinelli
- Giovanni d'Alemagna, uncle of Antonio Vivarini
- Sofonisba Anguissola
- Lorenzo Bartolini
- Fra Bartolomeo
- Luca Baudo
- Alessandro Mazzola Bedoli
- Jacopo Bellini
- Giuseppe Bertini
- Vitale da Bologna
- Francesco Bonsignori
- Paolo Borroni
- Alessandro Bonvicino (il Moretto)
- Botticelli
- Giulio Campi
- Canaletto
- Francesco Capella (Dagiù)
- Cristoforo Caselli
- Jacopo del Casentino
- Giovanni Benedetto Castiglione
- Bernardo Cavallino
- Luigi Cavenaghi (see The Last Supper (Leonardo)
- Cima da Conegliano
- Luigi Crespi
- Daddi
- Gaetano Fasanotti
- Gaudenzio Ferrari
- Fetti
- Ambrogio Bergognone
- Gaetano Gandolfi
- Raffaellino del Garbo
- Baciccio
- Giovanni Francesco Gessi
- Giordano
- Francesco Guardi
- Giacomo Guardi
- Francesco Hayez
- Pietro degli Ingannati
- Filippo Lippi
- Pietro Lorenzetti
- Lotto
- Bernardino Luini
- Giovanni Francesco Maineri
- Rutilio Manetti
- Andrea Mantegna
- Giovanni Martinelli
- il Morazzone
- Livio Mehus
- Lippo Memmi
- Michelangelo
- Francesco Morone
- Moroni
- Carlo Francese & Giuseppe Nuvolone (sons of (Panfilo Nuvolone)
- Marco D'Oggione
- Eleuterio Pagliano
- Filippo Palizzi, contemporary of Cornelius Van Leemputten
- Palma il Vecchio
- Marco Palmezzano
- Perugino
- Cesco Pesellino
- di Pietro (Lo Spagna)
- Antonio Pirri
- Pollaiolo
- Riccardo Pellegrini
- Giulio Cesare Procaccini
- Raibolini,il Francia
- Ribera
- Giovanni Pietro Rizzoli
- il Sassoferrato
- Il Salviati
- Raphael
- Luigi Scrosati
- Fra Semplice da Verona
- Cesare da Sesto
- Giovanni Servi
- Andrea Solario
- Gherardo Starnina
- Bernardo Strozzi
- Zanobi Strozzi, pupil of Fra Angelico
- Cesare Tamaroccio
- Francesco de Tatti
- Girolamo Tessari
- Tiepolo
- Cosmè Tura
- Giovanni de' Vecchi
- Bartolomeo Veneto
- Antonio Vighi

== Northern European painters ==
Painters in the collection include: Breughel the younger; Cranach; Goltzius; James Baker Pyne; Thomas Shotter Boys; Sutterman; Teniers the younger; Jacob Toorenvliet; Pierre Tetar van Elven; Mathijs Van Hellemont; Jan Van der Meer II; Willem Van Mieris; Jacob Ferdinand Voet; Nicolaus Alexander Mair Von Landshut, (Mair Landshut); and Cornelis de Wael.

== Examples of the collection ==
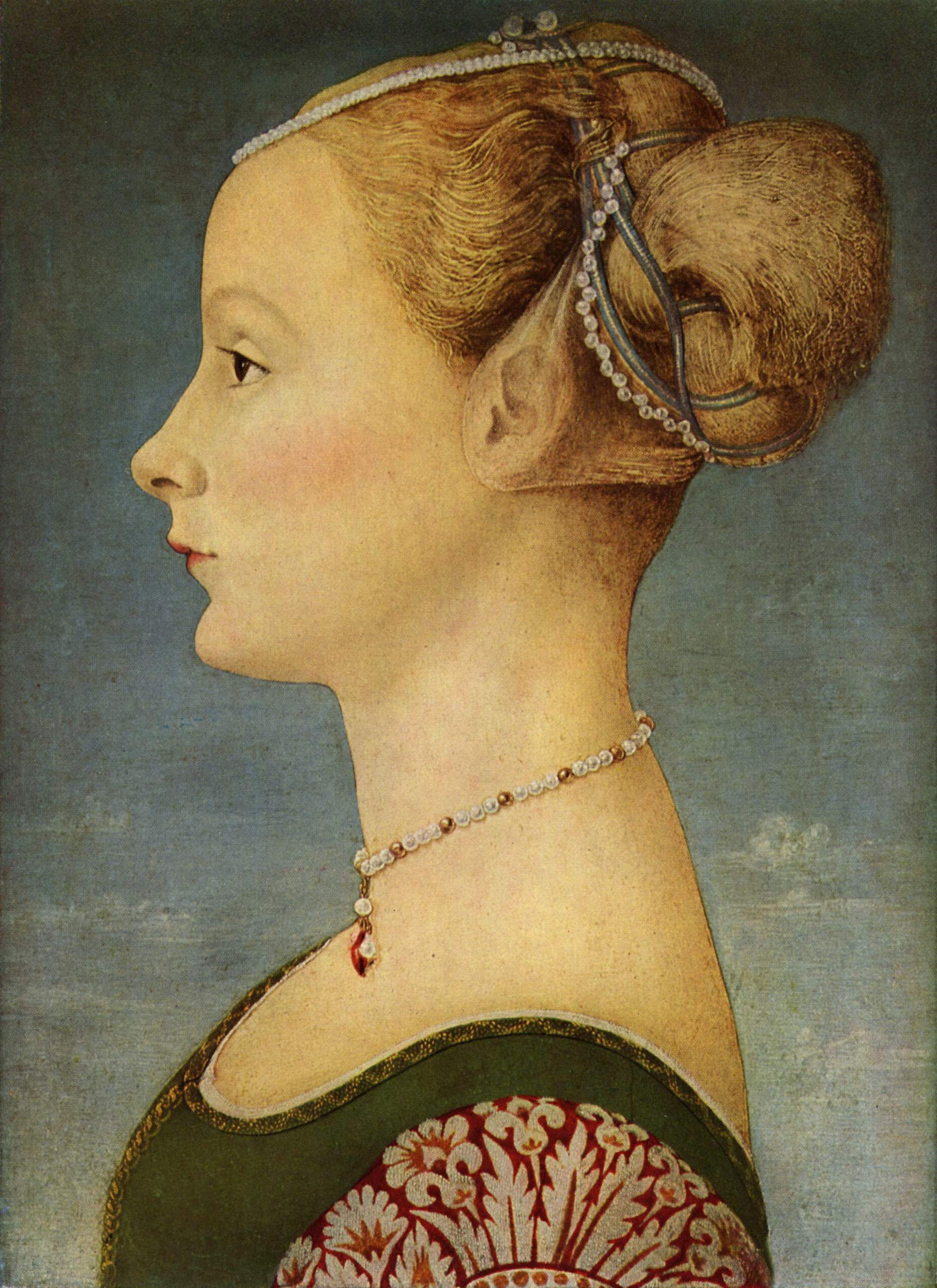
Piero del Pollaiuolo (or Antonio), Portrait of a Young Woman

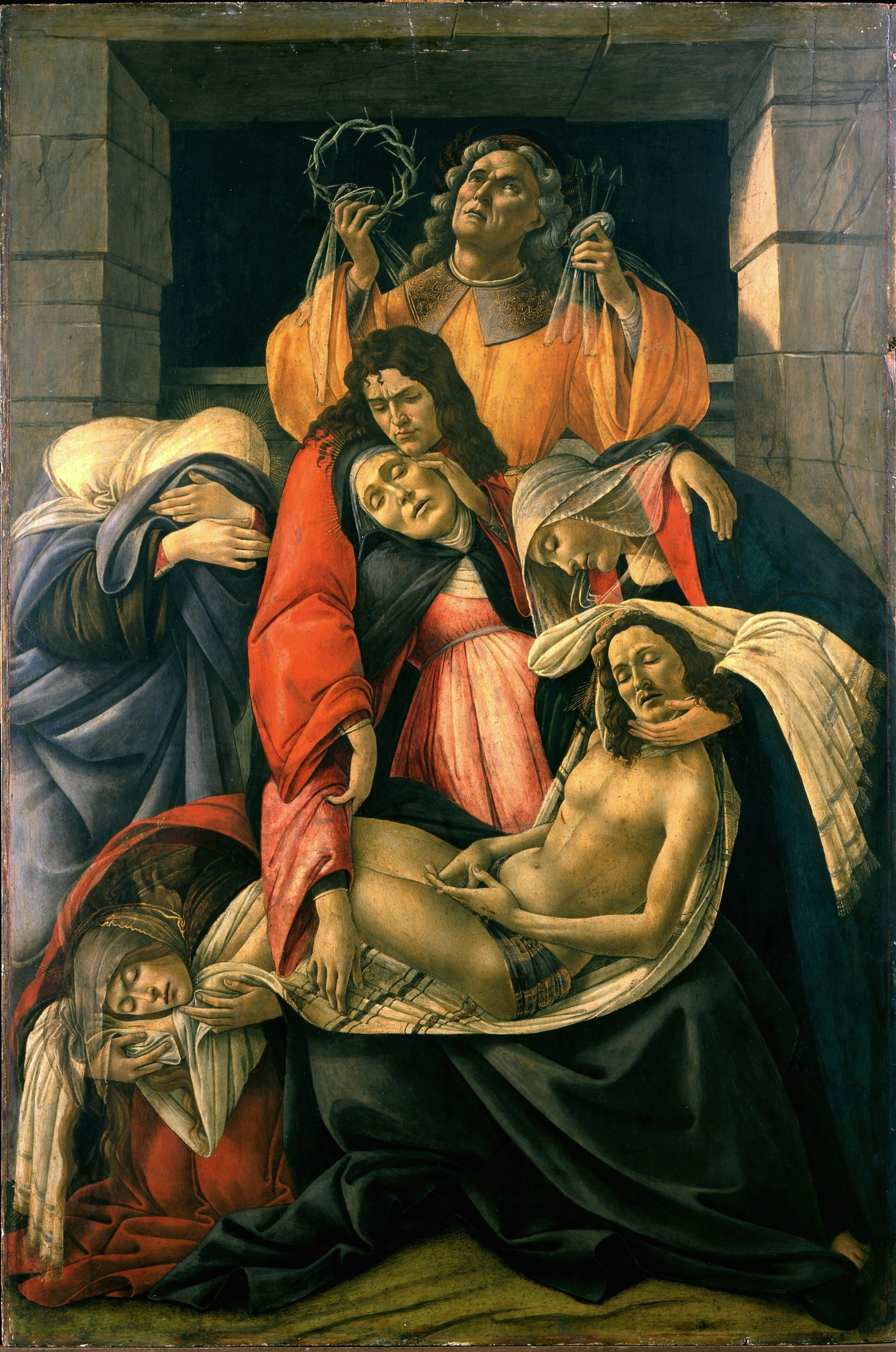
Sandro Botticelli, Lamentation over the Dead Christ

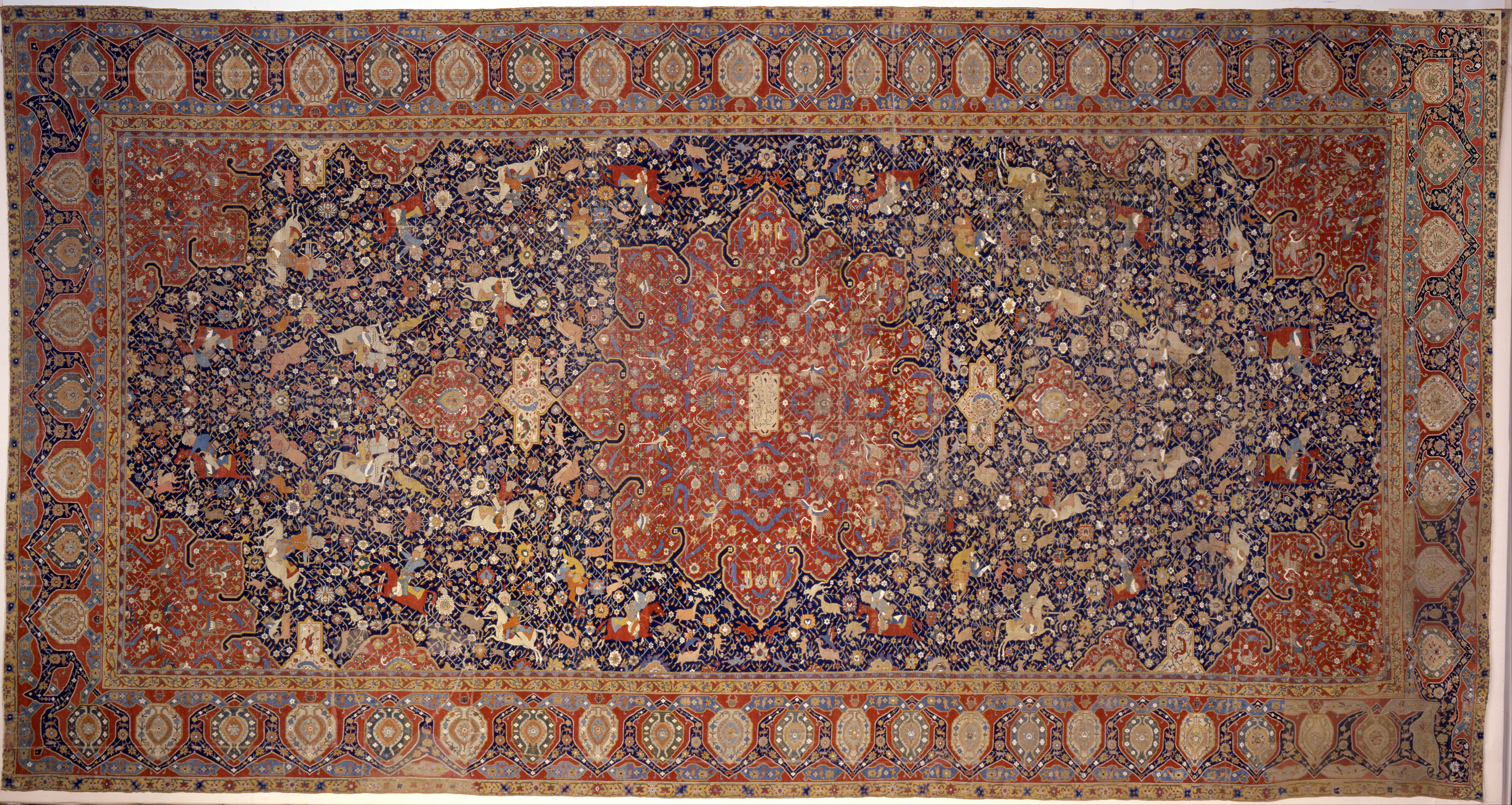
Hunting, Fine Persian Carpet made by Ghyath ud-Din Jami, Wool, cotton and silk
