= Madonna (art) =

Artistic representation of Mary

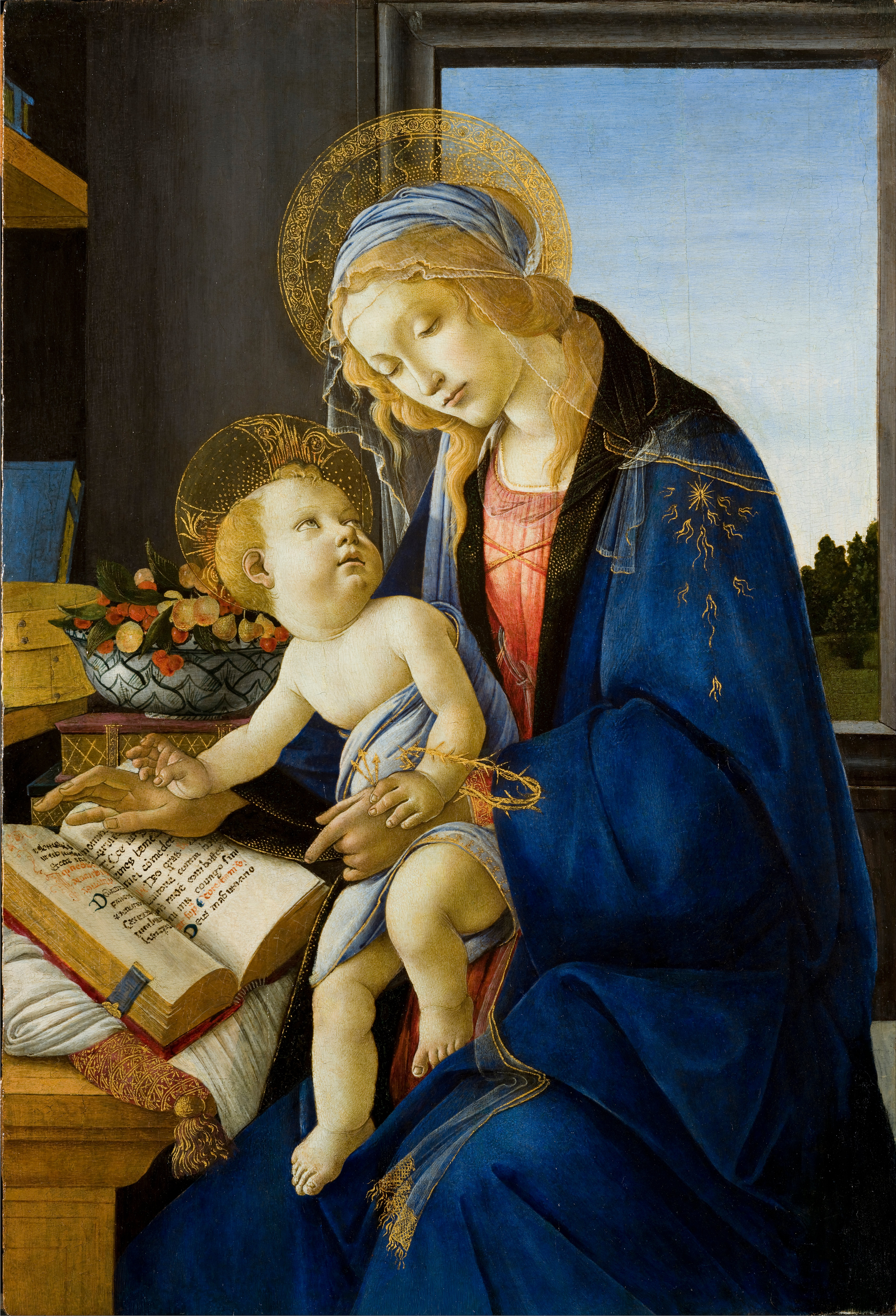
Madonna of the Book by Sandro Botticelli, 1480

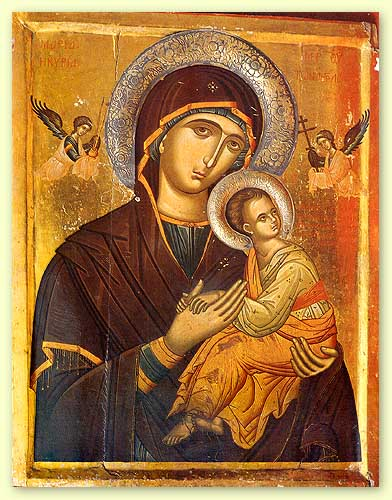
Our Mother of Perpetual Help, Icon of the Virgin Mary, 16th century. St. Catherine's Monastery in the Sinai.

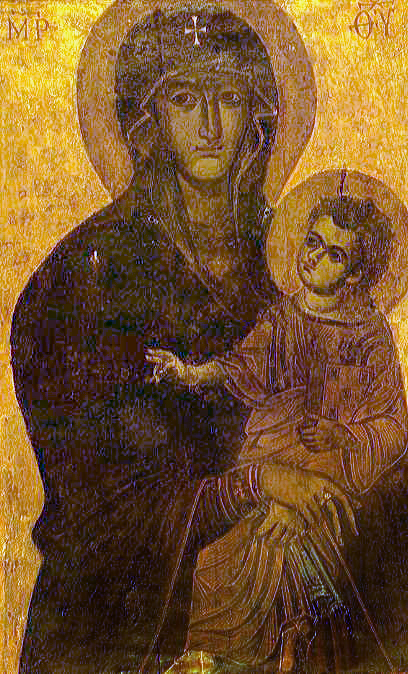
The Salus Populi Romani icon, overpainted in the 13th century, but going back to an underlying original dated to the 5th or 6th century

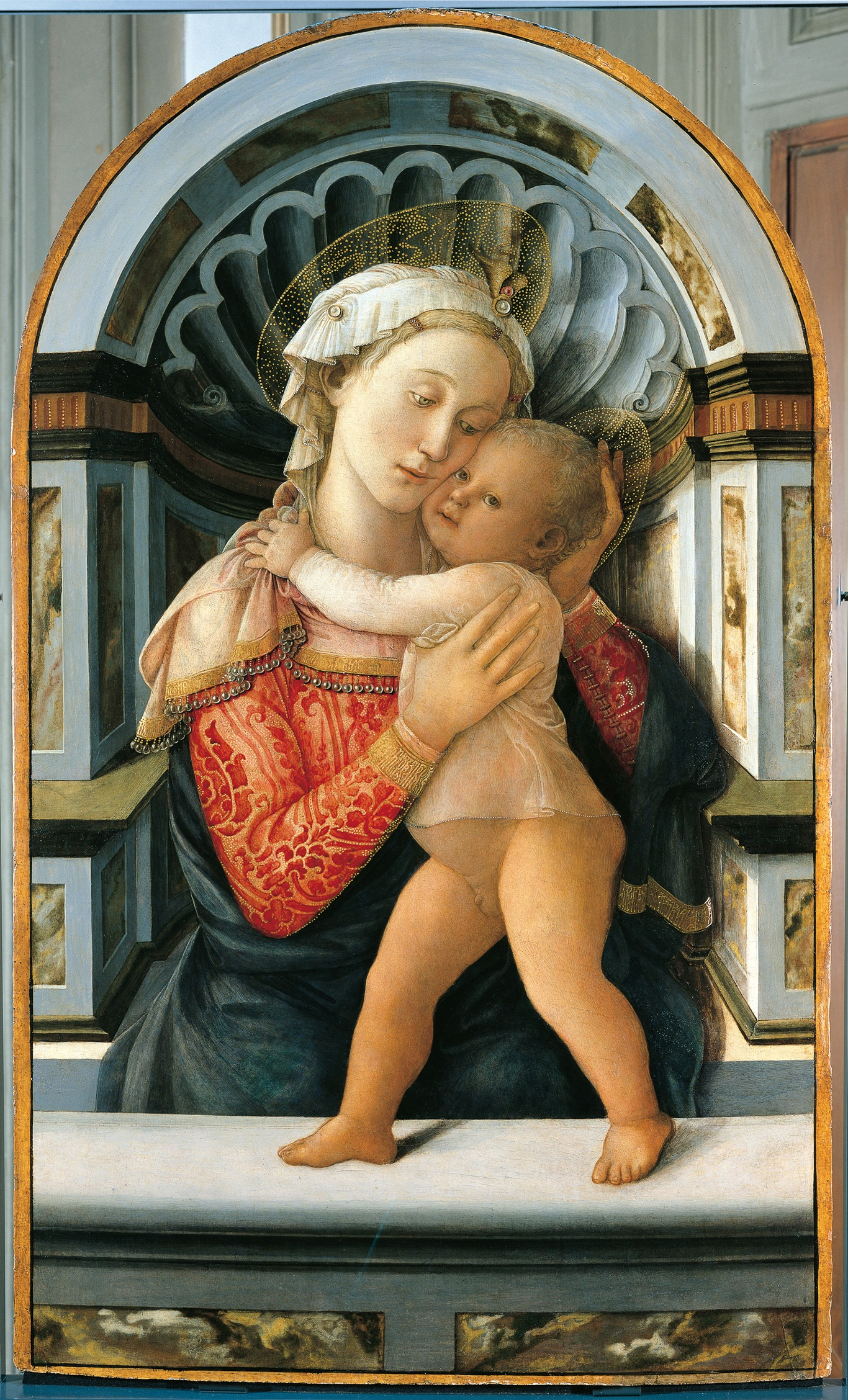
Madonna and Child by Filippo Lippi (15th century)

In Christian art, a Madonna (Italian: [maˈdɔnna]) is a religious depiction of the Blessed Virgin Mary in a singular form or sometimes accompanied by the Child Jesus. These images are central icons for both the Catholic and Orthodox churches, and are found within a number of Evangelical-Lutheran churches as well. The word is from Italian ma donna 'my lady' (archaic). The Madonna and Child type is very prevalent in Christian iconography, divided into many traditional subtypes especially in Eastern Orthodox iconography, often known after the location of a notable icon of the type, such as the Theotokos of Vladimir, Agiosoritissa, Blachernitissa, etc., or descriptive of the depicted posture, as in Hodegetria, Eleusa, etc.

The term Madonna in the sense of "picture or statue of the Virgin Mary" enters English usage in the 17th century, primarily in reference to works of the Italian Renaissance. In an Eastern Orthodox context, such images are typically known as Theotokos. "Madonna" may be generally used of representations of Mary, with or without the infant Jesus, where she is the focus and central figure of the image, possibly flanked or surrounded by angels or saints. Other types of Marian imagery that have a narrative context, depicting scenes from the Life of the Virgin, e.g. the Annunciation to Mary, are not typically called "Madonna".

The classical "Madonna" or "Theotokos" imagery develops from the 5th century, as Marian devotion rose to great importance after the Council of Ephesus formally affirmed her status as "Mother of God or Theotokos ("God-bearer") in 431. The Theotokos iconography as it developed in the 6th to 8th century rose to great importance in the high medieval period (12th to 14th centuries) both in the Eastern Orthodox and in the Latin spheres.

According to a tradition first recorded in the 8th century, and still strong in the Eastern Church, the iconography of images of Mary goes back to a portrait drawn from life by Luke the Evangelist, with a number of icons (such as the Panagia Portaitissa) claimed to either represent this original icon or to be a direct copy of it. In the Western tradition, depictions of the Madonna were greatly diversified by Renaissance masters such as Duccio, Leonardo da Vinci, Michelangelo, Raphael, Giovanni Bellini, Caravaggio, and Rubens (and further by certain modernists such as Salvador Dalí and Henry Moore), while Eastern Orthodox iconography adheres more closely to the inherited traditional types.

== Terminology ==
Liturgy depicting Mary as powerful intercessor (such as the Akathist) was brought from Greek into Latin tradition in the 8th century. The Greek title of Δεσποινα (Despoina) was adopted as Latin Domina "Lady". The medieval Italian Ma Donna pronounced [maˈdɔnna] ("My Lady") reflects Mea Domina, while Nostra Domina (δεσποινίς ἡμῶν) was adopted in French, as Nostre Dame "Our Lady".

These names signal both the increased importance of the cult of the virgin and the prominence of art in service to Marian devotion during the late medieval period. During the 13th century, especially, with the increasing influence of chivalry and aristocratic culture on poetry, song and the visual arts, the Madonna is represented as the queen of Heaven, often enthroned, such as the Ognissanti Madonna. Madonna was meant more to remind people of the theological concept which is placing such a high value on purity or virginity. This is also represented by the color of her clothing. The color blue symbolized purity, virginity, and royalty. Ultramarine was usually reserved for only the most important commissions, such as the blue robes of the Virgin Mary in Gerard David's Virgin and Child with Female Saints.

While the Italian term Madonna paralleled English Our Lady in late medieval Marian devotion, it was imported as an art historical term into English usage in the 1640s, designating specifically the Marian art of the Italian Renaissance. In this sense, "a Madonna", or "a Madonna with Child" is used of specific works of art, historically mostly of Italian works. A "Madonna" may alternatively be called "Virgin" or "Our Lady", but "Madonna" is not typically applied to eastern works; e.g. the Theotokos of Vladimir may in English be called "Our Lady of Vladimir", while it is less usual, but not unheard of, to refer to it as the "Madonna of Vladimir".

== Modes of representation ==
There are several distinct types of representation of the Madonna.

- One type of Madonna shows Mary alone (without the child Jesus), and standing, generally glorified and with a gesture of prayer, benediction or prophesy. This type of image occurs in a number of ancient apsidal mosaics.
- Full-length standing images of the Madonna more frequently include the infant Jesus, who turns towards the viewer or raises his hand in benediction. The most famous Byzantine image, the Hodegetria was originally of this type, though most copies are at half-length. This type of image occurs frequently in sculpture and may be found in fragile ivory carvings, in limestone on the central door posts of many cathedrals, and in polychrome wooden or plaster casts in almost every Catholic Church. There are a number of famous paintings that depict the Madonna in this manner, notably the Sistine Madonna by Raphael.
- The "Madonna enthroned" is a type of image that dates from the Byzantine period and was used widely in Medieval and Renaissance times. These representations of the Madonna and Child often take the form of large altarpieces. They also occur as frescoes and apsidal mosaics. In Medieval examples the Madonna is often accompanied by angels who support the throne, or by rows of saints. In Renaissance painting, particularly High Renaissance painting, the saints may be grouped informally in a type of composition known as a Sacra conversazione.
- The Madonna of humility refers to portrayals in which the Madonna is sitting on the ground, or sitting upon a low cushion. She may be holding the Child Jesus in her lap. This style was a product of Franciscan piety, and perhaps due to Simone Martini. It spread quickly through Italy and by 1375 examples began to appear in Spain, France and Germany. It was the most popular among the styles of the early Trecento artistic period.
- Half-length Madonnas are the form most frequently taken by painted icons of the Eastern Orthodox Church, where the subject matter is highly formulated so that each painting expresses one particular attribute of the "Mother of God". Half-length paintings of the Madonna and Child are also common in Italian Renaissance painting, particularly in Venice.
- The seated "Madonna and Child" is a style of image that became particularly popular during the 15th century in Florence and was imitated elsewhere. These representations are usually of a small size suitable for a small altar or domestic use. They usually show Mary holding the infant Jesus in an informal and maternal manner. These paintings often include symbolic reference to the Passion of Christ.
- The "Adoring Madonna" is a type popular during the Renaissance. These images, usually small and intended for personal devotion, show Mary kneeling in adoration of the Christ Child. Many such images were produced in glazed terracotta as well as paint. Examples include, Madonna Adoring the Sleeping Christ Child and Madonna Adoring the Child with Five Angels (Botticelli).
- The Nursing Madonna, Virgo Lactans, or Madonna Lactans, is an iconography of the Madonna and Child in which the Virgin Mary is shown breastfeeding the infant Jesus. Examples include Leonardo da Vinci's Madonna Litta.
- The iconography of the Woman of the Apocalypse is applied to Marian portraiture in a variety of ways over time, depending on the interpretation of the relevant Biblical passage.
- Hodegetria, or Virgin Hodegetria, is an iconographic depiction of the Theotokos (Virgin Mary) holding the Child Jesus at her side while pointing to him as the source of salvation for humankind. In the Western Church this type of icon is sometimes called Our Lady of the Way.
- Eleusa icon, the Eleusa (or Eleousa; Greek: Ἐλεούσα – tenderness or showing mercy) is a type of depiction of the Virgin Mary in icons in which the Christ Child is nestled against her cheek. In the Western Church the type is often known as the Virgin of Tenderness.
- The Rest on the Flight into Egypt is a subject in Christian art showing Mary, Joseph, and the infant Jesus resting during their flight into Egypt. The Holy Family is normally shown in a landscape. Examples include Rest on the Flight into Egypt (Caravaggio), and they often depict Virgo Lactans.
- The term Black Madonna or Black Virgin tends to refer to statues or paintings in Western Christendom of the Blessed Virgin Mary and the Infant Jesus, where both figures are depicted as black. The Black Madonna can be found both in Catholic and Orthodox countries, and may or may not be related to liberation theology.
- Mary in Islam, as Maryam (Mary) is one of the most honored figures in Islamic theology she is exempt from aniconism in Islam.
- Girlhood of Mary, is iconography that features the Virgin Mary as a child, often learning needlework, and examples include The Girlhood of Mary Virgin, by artist Dante Gabriel Rossetti, which is of note that Mary is the obvious central figure.
- the Annunciation to the Blessed Virgin Mary, is iconography showing the announcement by the angel Gabriel to Mary that she would conceive and bear a son through a virgin birth. Examples include Dante Gabriel Rossetti's 1850 Ecce Ancilla Domini!.
- Death of the Virgin, Assumption of the Virgin Mary in art, Coronation of the Virgin although doctrine avoids stating whether Mary was alive or dead when she was bodily taken up to Heaven, she is normally shown in art as alive. Depicting the Coronation of Mary as Queen of the Heavens by her son, Jesus Christ, sometimes combined with the Assumption of Mary, is a tradition known since the 12th century. They often depict birds, as an appropriate image of God as the Holy Spirit.
- Holy Family is iconography of Mary, Joseph, and Jesus. The example Holy Family with Saints Anne and John the Baptist (Mantegna) portrays their Presentation of Jesus at the Temple and includes other Saints in the image.
- Marian apparition the Nuestra Señora de Guadalupe is the most-visited Catholic shrine in the world, and the venerated icon has a sunburst of straight and wavy gold rays alternate while projecting behind the Virgin and are enclosed within a mandorla.

== History ==
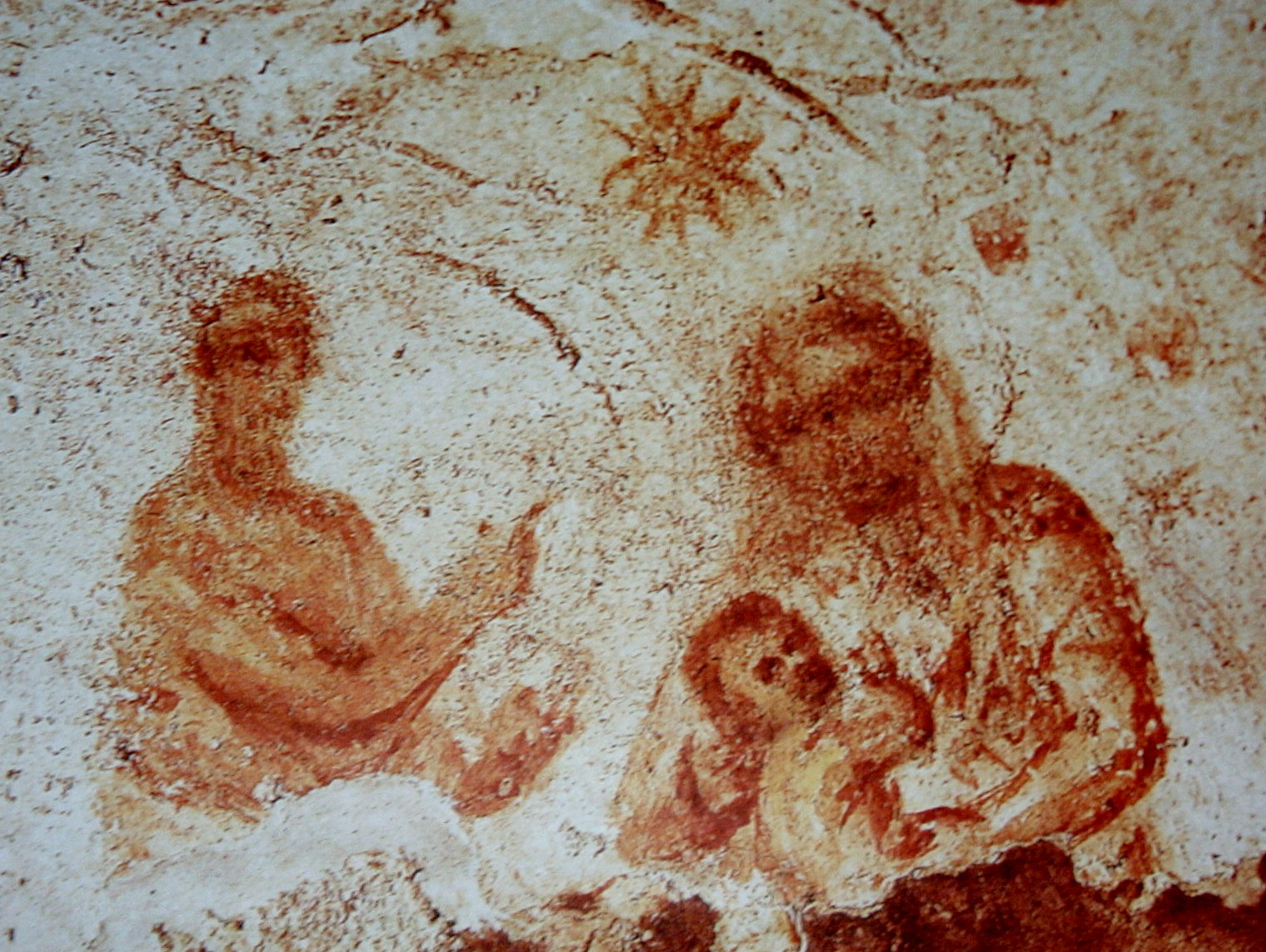
The Virgin and Child in the Catacomb of Priscilla

The earliest depictions of Mary date to Early Christian art of the (2nd to 3rd centuries, found in the Catacombs of Rome. These are in a narrative context. The earliest representation may be the wall painting in the Catacomb of Priscilla (2nd century), in which the seated Madonna suckles the Child, who turns his head to gaze at the spectator.

The earliest consistent representations of Mother and Child were developed in the Byzantine Empire, where despite an iconoclastic strain in culture that rejected physical representations, considering it as idolatry, respected a narrow range of highly conventionalized religious image types or icons (from the Greek eikōn (εἰκών) meaning "image," "likeness," or "portrait"). This tradition of the Eastern Christian Church was so important that during a visit to Constantinople in 536, Pope Agapetus I was accused of being opposed to the veneration of the theotokos and to the portrayal of her image in churches. Eastern Christian Church depictions show the Madonna enthroned, even wearing the closed Byzantine pearl-encrusted crown with pendants, with the Christ Child on her lap.

In the West, the formalized Byzantine depictions of the Virgin and Child were closely followed during the Early Middle Ages. Starting in the 15th century, Florentine painters started to humanize her and making her look more real. representation of the Virgin, and the Child may be fully aware, raising his hand to offer his blessing.

With the increased importance of the cult of the Virgin in the 12th and 13th centuries, a wide variety of types developed to satisfy a flood of more intensely personal forms of piety. In the usual Gothic and Renaissance formulas the Virgin Mary sits with the Infant Jesus on her lap, or enfolded in her arms. In the admired Madonna della Seggiolsa (chair), painted by Raphael in 1532–1534, she looks very much like a real person, but at the same time, Raphael masterfully transmits her purity and saintliness.

Late Gothic sculptures of the Virgin and Child may show a standing virgin with the child in her arms. Iconography varies between public images and private images supplied on a smaller scale and meant for personal devotion in the chamber: the Child suckling the Virgin (such as the Madonna Litta) is an image largely confined to private devotional icons.

=== Early images ===
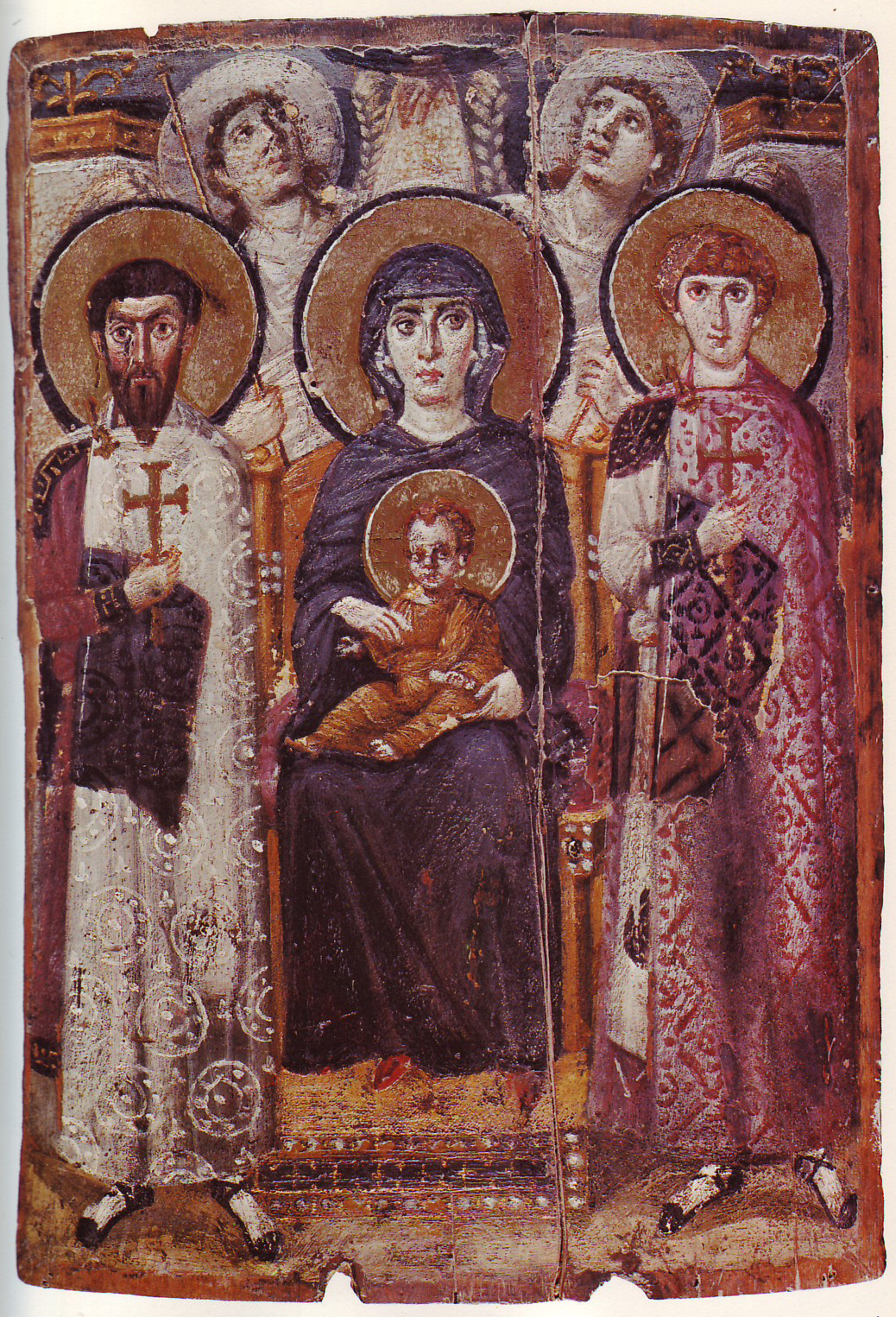
Icon of the enthroned Virgin and Child with saints and angels, and the Hand of God above, 6th century, Saint Catherine's Monastery, perhaps the earliest iconic image of the subject to survive

There was a great expansion of the cult of Mary after the Council of Ephesus in 431, when her status as Theotokos ("God-bearer") was confirmed; this had been a subject of some controversy until then, though mainly for reasons to do with arguments over the nature of Christ. In mosaics in Santa Maria Maggiore in Rome, dating from 432 to 440, just after the council, she is not yet shown with a halo, and she is also not shown in Nativity scenes at this date, though she is included in the Adoration of the Magi.

By the next century the iconic depiction of the Virgin enthroned carrying the infant Christ was established, as in the example from the only group of icons surviving from this period, at Saint Catherine's Monastery in Egypt. This type of depiction, with subtly changing differences of emphasis, has remained the mainstay of depictions of Mary to the present day. The image at Mount Sinai succeeds in combining two aspects of Mary described in the Magnificat, her humility and her exaltation above other humans, and has the Hand of God above, up to which the archangels look. An early icon of the Virgin as queen is in the church of Santa Maria in Trastevere in Rome, datable to 705–707 by the kneeling figure of Pope John VII, a notable promoter of the cult of the Virgin, to whom the infant Christ reaches his hand. This type was long confined to Rome. The roughly half-dozen varied icons of the Virgin and Child in Rome from the 6th–8th century form the majority of the representations surviving from this period; "isolated images of the Madonna and Child ... are so common ... to the present day in Catholic and Orthodox tradition, that it is difficult to recover a sense of the novelty of such images in the early Middle Ages, at least in western Europe".

At this period the iconography of the Nativity was taking the form, centred on Mary that it has retained up to the present day in Eastern Orthodoxy, and on which Western depictions remained based until the High Middle Ages. Other narrative scenes for Byzantine cycles on the Life of the Virgin were being evolved, relying on apocyphal sources to fill in her life before the Annunciation to Mary. By this time the political and economic collapse of the Western Roman Empire meant that the Western Church based in Rome was unable to compete in the development of such sophisticated iconography, and relied heavily on Byzantine developments.

The earliest surviving image in a Western illuminated manuscript of the Madonna and Child comes from the Book of Kells of about 800 CE (there is a similar carved image on the lid of St Cuthbert's coffin of 698) and though magnificently decorated in the style of Insular art, the drawing of the figures can only be described as rather crude compared to Byzantine work of the period. This was in fact an unusual inclusion in a Gospel book, and images of the Virgin were slow to appear in large numbers in manuscript art until the Book of Hours was created in the 13th century.

The Madonna of humility by Domenico di Bartolo, 1433, is considered one of the most innovative devotional images from the early Renaissance.

=== Byzantine influence on the West ===
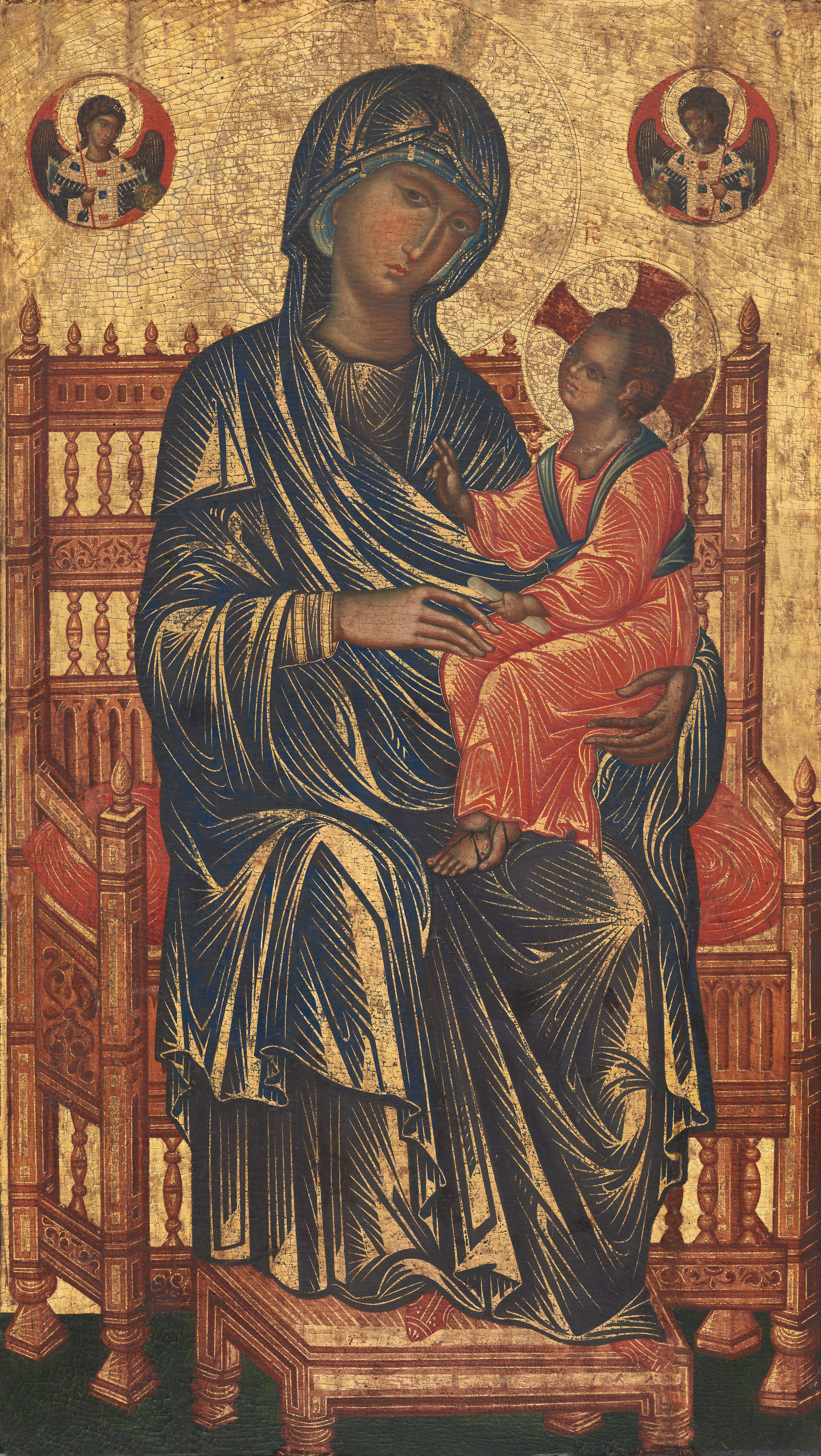
13th-century Madonna with Child in the Italo-Byzantine style

Very few early images of the Virgin Mary survive, though the depiction of the Madonna has roots in ancient pictorial and sculptural traditions that informed the earliest Christian communities throughout Europe, Northern Africa and the Middle East. Important to Italian tradition are Byzantine icons, especially those created in Constantinople (Istanbul), the capital of the longest, enduring medieval civilization whose icons participated in civic life and were celebrated for their miraculous properties. Byzantium (324–1453) saw itself as the true Rome, if Greek-speaking, Christian empire with colonies of Italians living among its citizens, participating in Crusades at the borders of its land, and ultimately, plundering its churches, palaces and monasteries of many of its treasures. Later in the Middle Ages, the Cretan school was the main source of icons for the West, and the artists there could adapt their style to Western iconography when required.

While theft is one way that Byzantine images made their way West to Italy, the relationship between Byzantine icons and Italian images of the Madonna is far more rich and complicated. Byzantine art played a long, critical role in Western Europe, especially when Byzantine territories included parts of Eastern Europe, Greece and much of Italy itself. Byzantine manuscripts, ivories, gold, silver and luxurious textiles were distributed throughout the West. In Byzantium, Mary's usual title was the Theotokos or Mother of God, rather than the Virgin Mary and it was believed that salvation was delivered to the faithful at the moment of God's incarnation. That theological concept takes pictorial form in the image of Mary holding her infant son.

However, what is most relevant to the Byzantine heritage of the Madonna is twofold. First, the earliest surviving independent images of the Virgin Mary are found in Rome, the center of Christianity in the medieval West. One is a valued possession of Santa Maria in Trastevere, one of the many Roman churches dedicated to the Virgin Mary. Another, a splintered, repainted ghost of its former self, is venerated at the Pantheon, that great architectural wonder of the Ancient Roman Empire, that was rededicated to Mary as an expression of the Church's triumph. Both evoke Byzantine tradition in terms of their medium, that is, the technique and materials of the paintings, in that they were originally painted in tempera (egg yolk and ground pigments) on wooden panels. In this respect, they share the Ancient Roman heritage of Byzantine icons. Second, they share iconography, or subject matter. Each image stresses the maternal role that Mary plays, representing her in relationship to her infant son. It is difficult to gauge the dates of the cluster of these earlier images, however, they seem to be primarily works of the 7th and 8th centuries.

=== Later medieval period ===
It was not until the revival of monumental panel painting in Italy during the 12th and 13th centuries, that the image of the Madonna gains prominence outside of Rome, especially throughout Tuscany. While members of the mendicant orders of the Franciscan and Dominican Orders are some of the first to commission panels representing this subject matter, such works quickly became popular in monasteries, parish churches, and homes. The ubiquity of the Marian devotion was because she was considered as an intermediary to the mercy of Christ.

Some images of the Madonna were paid for by lay organizations called confraternities, who met to sing praises of the Virgin in chapels found within the newly reconstructed, spacious churches that were sometimes dedicated to her. Paying for such a work might also be seen as a form of devotion. Its expense is because of the use of very expensive materials. The most expensive was gold leaf, thin sheets gold applied in all parts of the panel that are not covered with paint, a visual analogue not only to the costly sheaths that medieval goldsmiths used to decorate altars, but also a means of surrounding the image of the Madonna with illumination from oil lamps and candles.

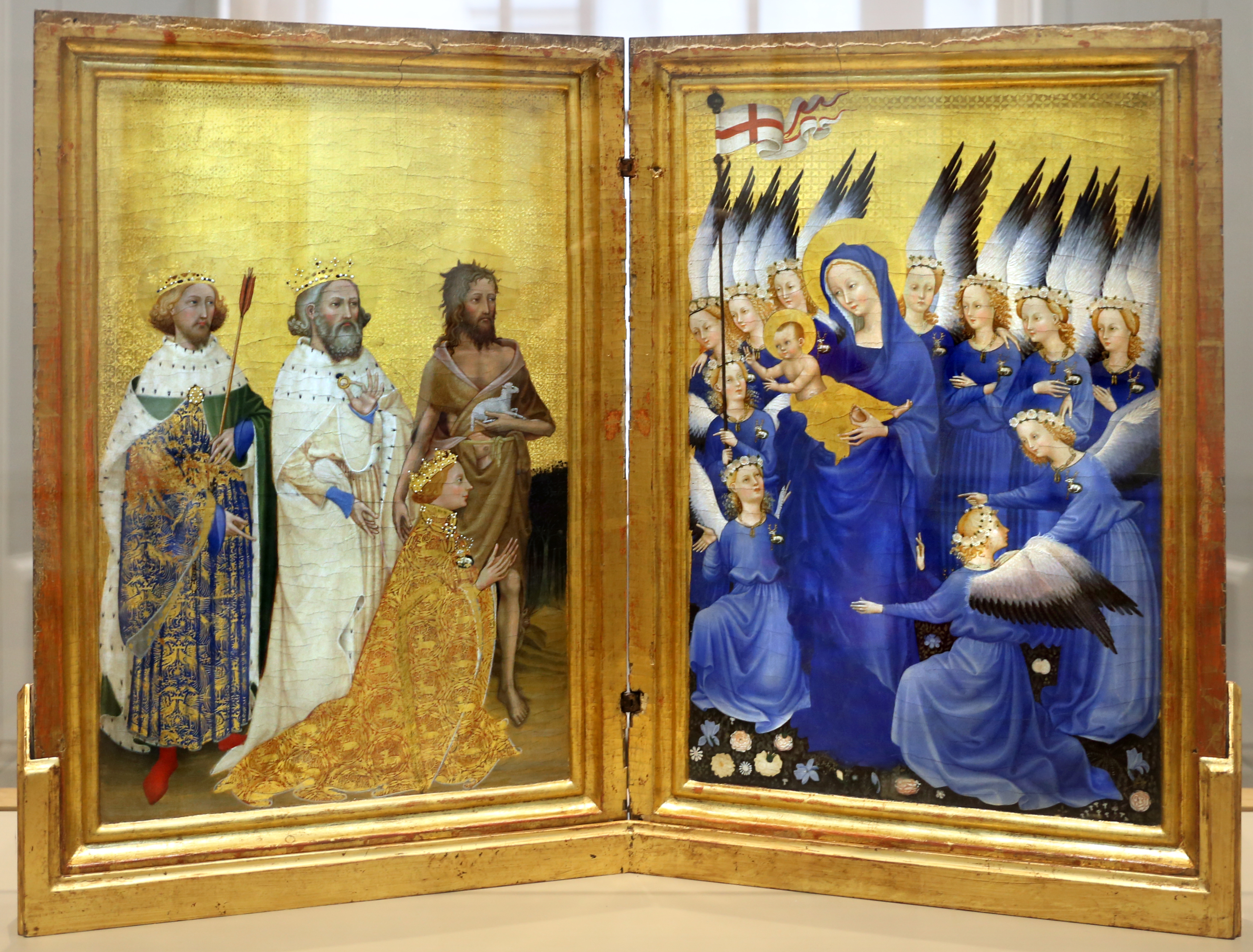
Wilton's Diptych, showing extensive use of gold and lapis lazuli (ca. 1395–1399, National Gallery, London).

Even more precious is the bright blue mantle colored with lapis lazuli; its cost by weight being only second to gold. But because gold leaf is very thin, by weight, more lapis lazuli paint than gold was required to cover large areas. The lapis lazuli pigment was made from the precious stone of the same name, at the time only found in mines in Afghanistan that were very hard to access. Furthermore, the process to obtain the pure pigment requires a laborious process. When a patron wanted this pigment to be used, he explicitly specified it in the commission contract.

The combined use of gold leaf and lapis lazuli blue paint can be seen in one of the most famous, innovative and monumental works that Duccio executed for the Laudesi at Santa Maria Novella in Florence, referred to as the Rucellai Madonna (c. 1285). This monumental painting towers over the spectator, offering a visual focus for members of the Laudesi confraternity to gather before it as they sang praises to the image. Duccio made an even grander image of the Madonna enthroned for the high altar of the cathedral of Siena, his home town. Known as the Maesta (1308–1311), the image represents the pair as the center of a densely populated court in the central part of a complexly carpentered work that lifts the court upon a predella (pedestal of altarpiece) of narrative scenes and standing figures of prophets and saints. In turn, a modestly scaled image of the Madonna as a half-length figure holding her son in a memorably intimate depiction, is to be found in the National Gallery of London. This is clearly made for the private devotion of a Christian wealthy enough to hire one of the most important Italian artists of his day.

The privileged owner need not go to Church to say his prayers or plead for salvation; all he or she had to do was open the shutters of the tabernacle in an act of private revelation. Duccio and his contemporaries inherited early pictorial conventions that were maintained in part, to tie their own works to the authority of tradition.

Despite all of the innovations of painters of the Madonna during the 13th and 14th centuries, Mary can usually be recognized by virtue of her attire. Customarily when she is represented as a youthful mother of her newborn child, she wears a deeply saturated blue mantle over a red garment. This mantle typically covers her head, where sometimes, one might see a linen, or later, transparent silk veil.

She holds the Christ Child, or Baby Jesus, who shares her halo as well as her regal bearing. Often her gaze is directed out at the viewer, serving as an intercessor, or conduit for prayers that flow from the Christian, to her, and only then, to her son. However, late medieval Italian artists also followed the trends of Byzantine icon painting, developing their own methods of depicting the Madonna. Sometimes, the Madonna's complex bond with her tiny child takes the form of a close, intimate moment of tenderness steeped in sorrow where she only has eyes for him.

While the focus of this entry currently stresses the depiction of the Madonna in panel painting, her image also appears in mural decoration, whether mosaics or fresco painting on the exteriors and interior of sacred buildings. She is found high above the apse, or east end of the church where the liturgy is celebrated in the West. She is also found in sculpted form, whether small ivories for private devotion, or large sculptural reliefs and free-standing sculpture. As a participant in sacred drama, her image inspires one of the most important fresco cycles in all of Italian painting: Giotto's narrative cycle in the Arena Chapel, next to the Scrovegni family's palace in Padua. This program dates to the first decade of the 14th century.

Italian artists of the 15th century onward are indebted to traditions established in the 13th and 14th centuries in their representation of the Madonna.

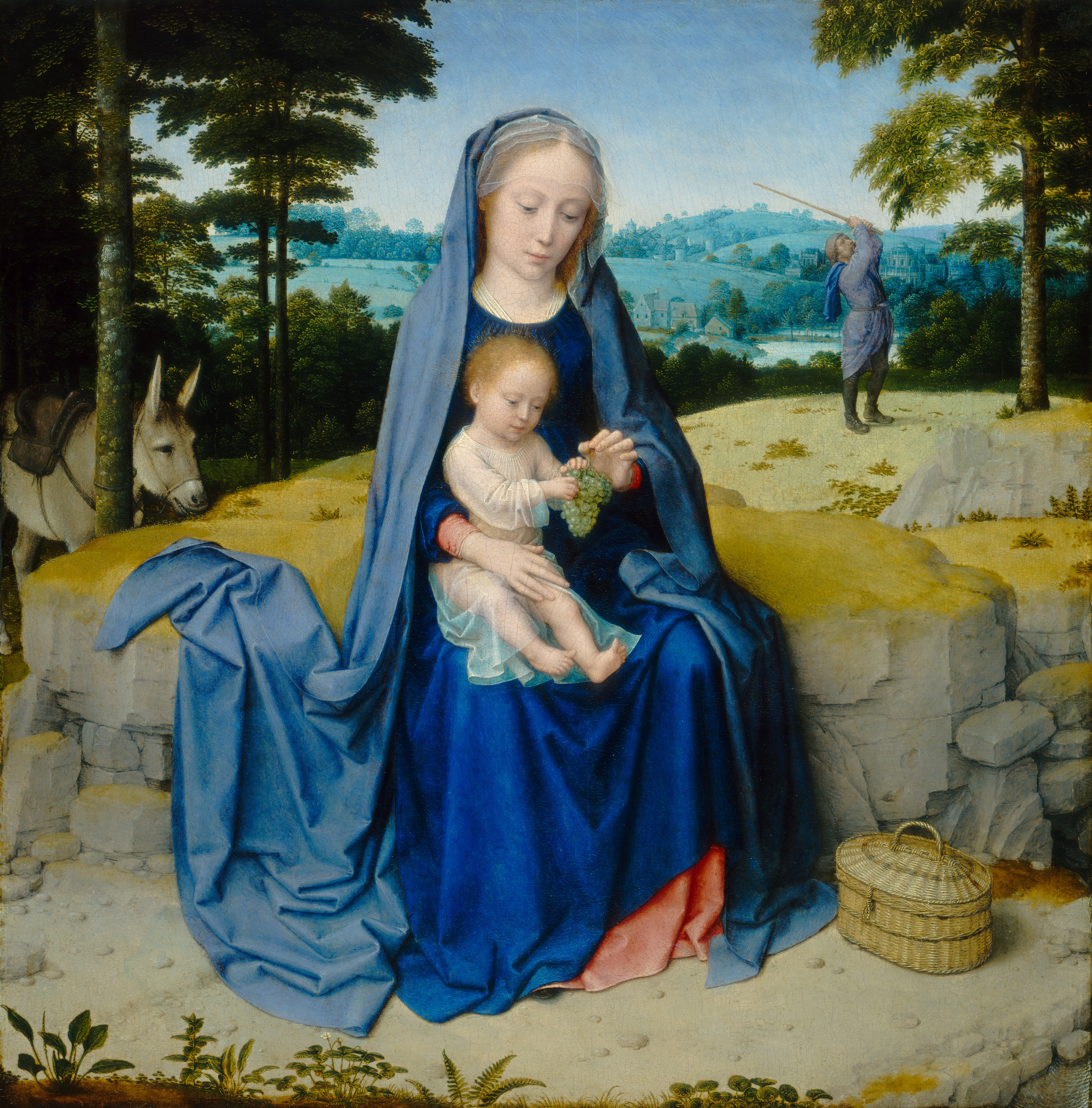
Rest on The Flight into Egypt, c. 1510, by Gerard David, depicts a close, intimate moment of tenderness where she only has eyes for the Child.

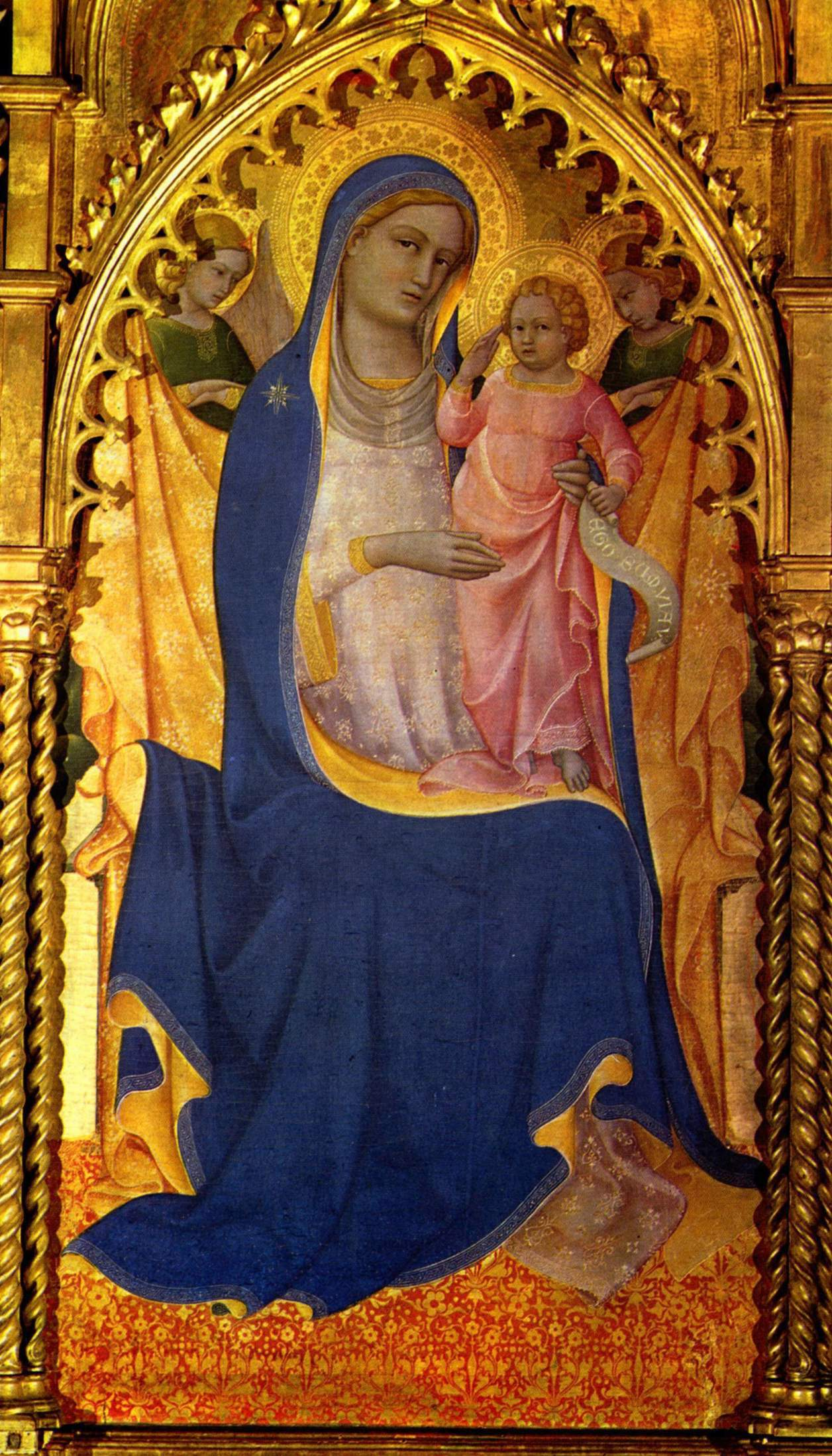
Lorenzo Monaco, Florence, c. 1410

=== Renaissance ===
While the 15th and 16th centuries were a time when Italian painters expanded their repertoire to include historical events, independent portraits and mythological subject matter, Christianity retained a strong hold on their careers. Most works of art from this era are sacred. While the range of religious subject matter included subjects from the Old Testament and images of saints whose cults date after the codification of the Bible, the Madonna remained a dominant subject in the iconography of the Renaissance.

Some of the most eminent 16th-century Italian painters to turn to this subject were Leonardo da Vinci, Michelangelo, Raphael, (Note: According to W. H. Wackenroder, some writings by Bramante reveal that Raphael told him that he discovered how to paint his Madonnas in a visionary dream he had after praying to the Virgin.) Giorgione, Giovanni Bellini and Titian. They developed on the foundations of 15th-century Marian images by Fra Angelico, Fra Filippo Lippi, Mantegna and Piero della Francesca in particular, among countless others. The subject was equally popular in Early Netherlandish painting and that of the rest of Northern Europe.

The subject retaining the greatest power on all of these men remained the maternal bond, even though other subjects, especially the Annunciation, and later the Immaculate Conception, led to a greater number of paintings that represented Mary alone, without her son. As a commemorative image, the Pietà became an important subject, newly freed from its former role in narrative cycles, in part, an outgrowth of popular devotional statues in Northern Europe. Traditionally, Mary is depicted expressing compassion, grief and love, usually in highly charged, emotional works of art even though the most famous, early work by Michelangelo stifles signs of mourning. The tenderness an ordinary mother might feel towards her beloved child is captured, evoking the moment when she first held her infant son Christ. The spectator, after all, is meant to sympathize, to share in the despair of the mother who holds the body of her crucified son.

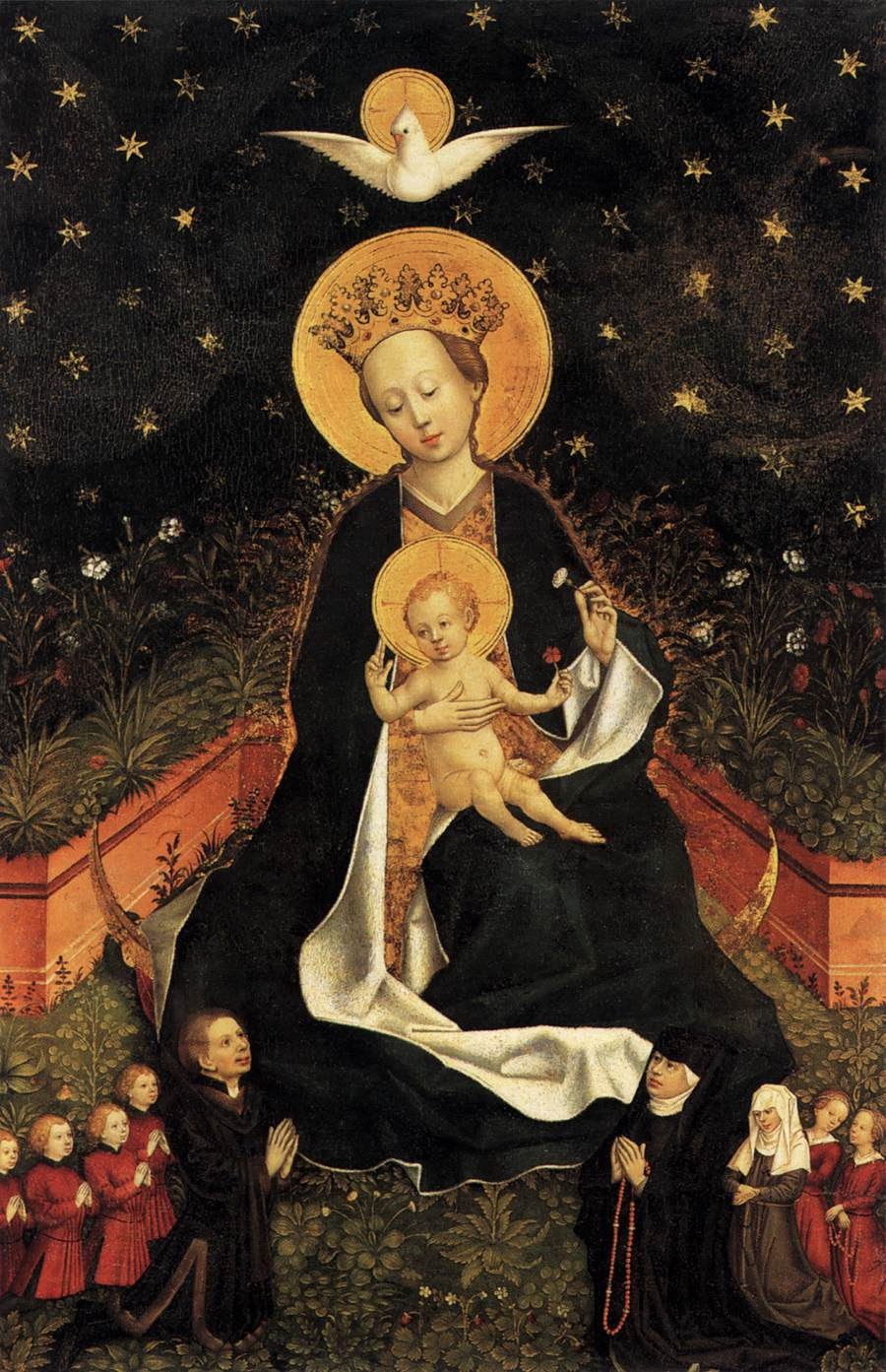
The Madonna on a Crescent Moon in Hortus Conclusus by an anonymous painter

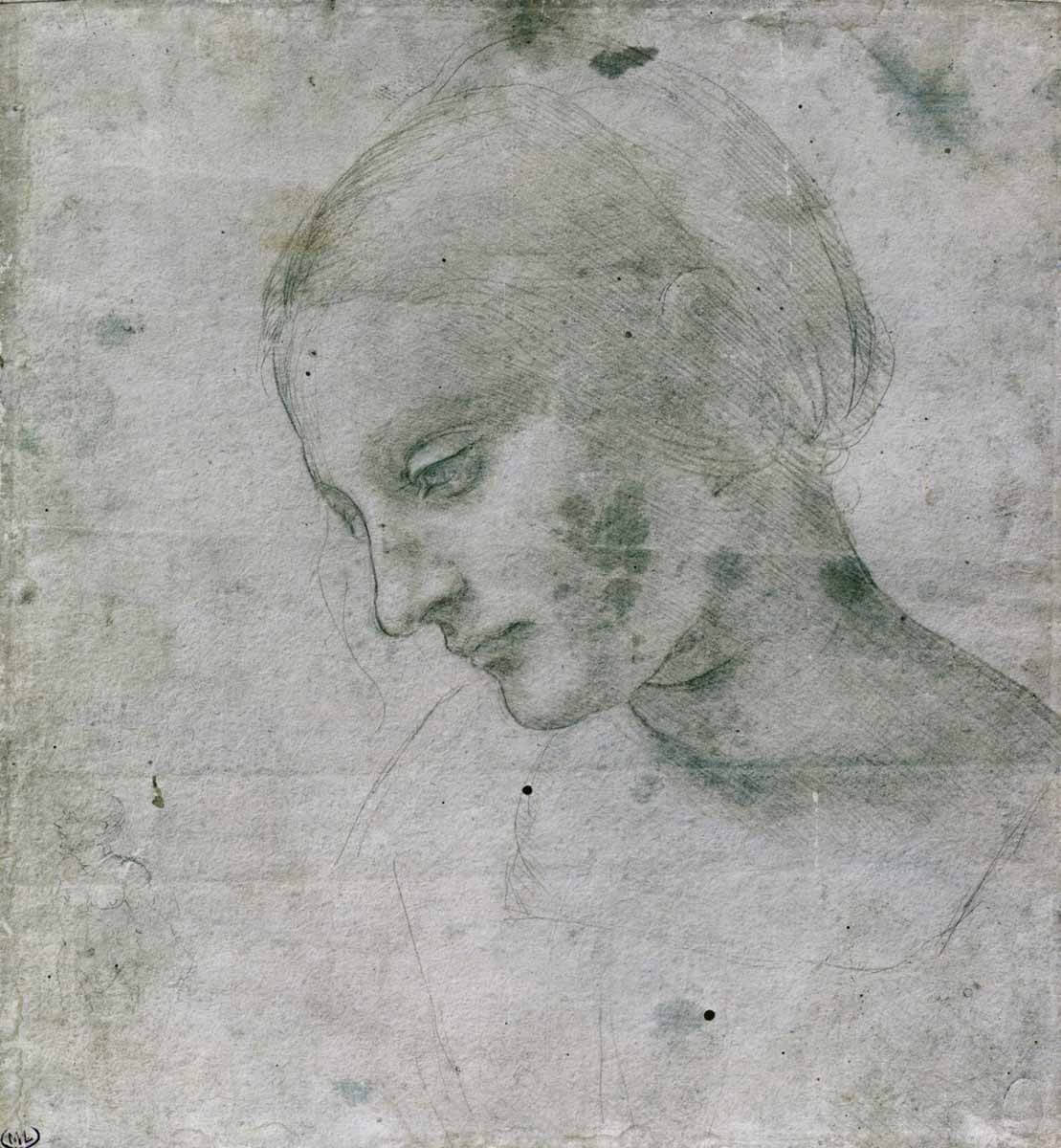
Leonardo da Vinci, a study of the Head of Madonna, c. 1484

=== Modern images ===
In some European countries, such as Germany, Italy and Poland sculptures of the Madonna are found on the outside of city houses and buildings, or along the roads in small enclosures. Statues of the Maddona are found in Roman Catholic and Evangelical-Lutheran churches; icons of the Madonna and child are found in Eastern Orthodox, Eastern Lutheran and Eastern Catholic churches, with their Western counterparts sometimes having them as well.

In Germany, such a statue placed on the outside of a building is called a Hausmadonna. Some date back to the Middle Ages, while some are still being made today. Usually found on the level of the second floor or higher, and often on the corner of a house, such sculptures were found in great numbers in many cities; Mainz, for instance, was supposed to have had more than 200 of them before World War II. The variety in such statues is as great as in other Madonna images; one finds Madonnas holding grapes (in reference to the Song of Songs 1:14, translated as "My lover is to me a cluster of henna blossoms" in the NIV), "immaculate" Madonnas in pure, perfect white without child or accessories, and Madonnas with roses symbolizing her life determined by the mysteries of faith.

In Italy, the roadside Madonna is a common sight both on the side of buildings and along roads in small enclosures. These are expected to bring spiritual relief to people who pass them. Some Madonnas statues are placed around Italian towns and villages as a matter of protection, or as a commemoration of a reported miracle.

In the 1920s, the Daughters of the American Revolution placed statues called the Madonna of the Trail from coast to coast, marking the path of the old National Road and the Santa Fe Trail.

Throughout his life, the painter Ray Martìn Abeyta created works inspired by the Cusco School style of Madonna painting, creating a hybrid of traditional and contemporary Latino subject matter representing the colonialist encounters between Europeans and Mesoamericans.

In 2015 iconographer Mark Dukes created the icon Our Lady of Ferguson, depicting the Madonna and child, in relation to the Shooting of Michael Brown in Ferguson, Missouri.

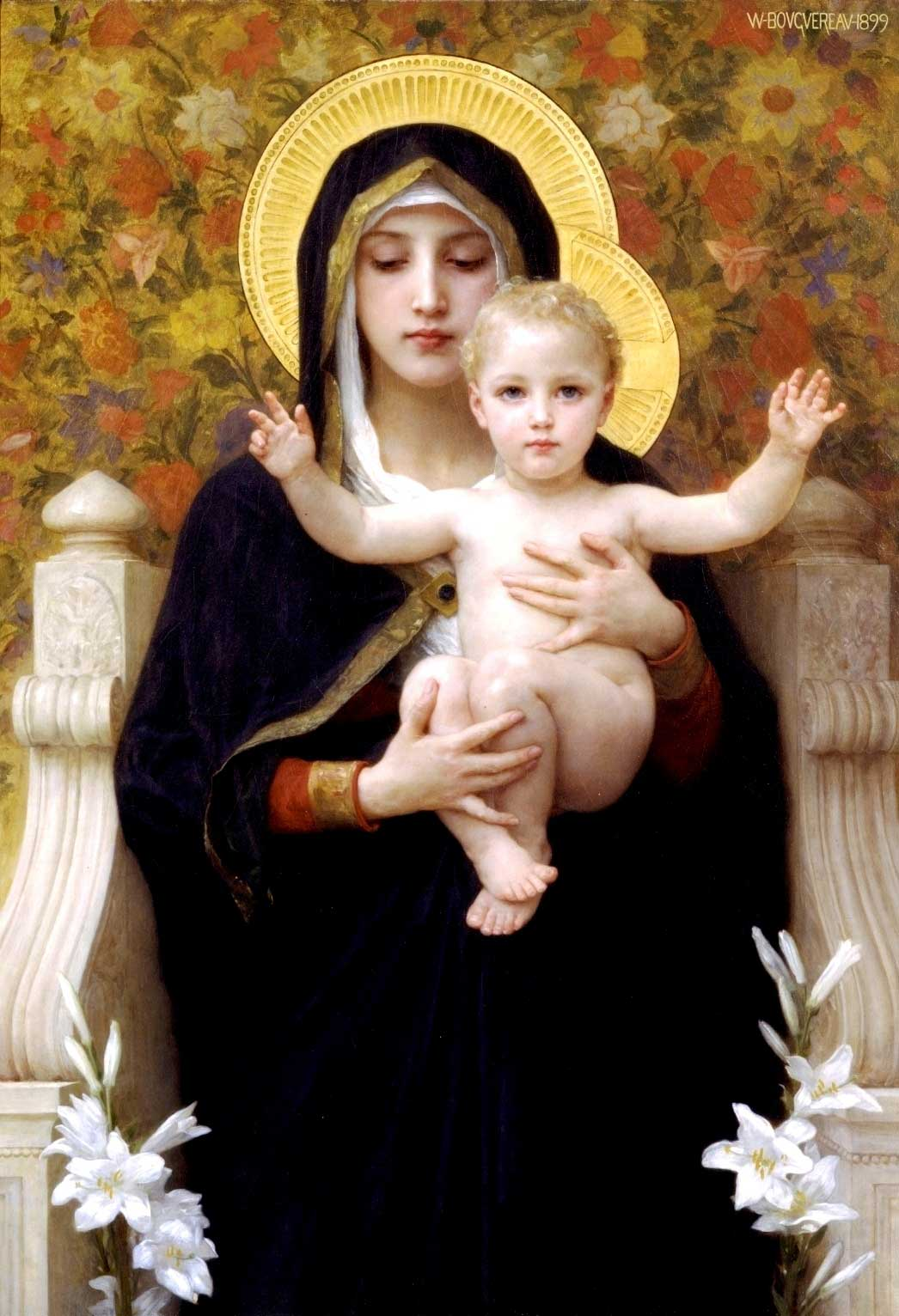
Virgin of the Lilies, Bouguereau, 1899

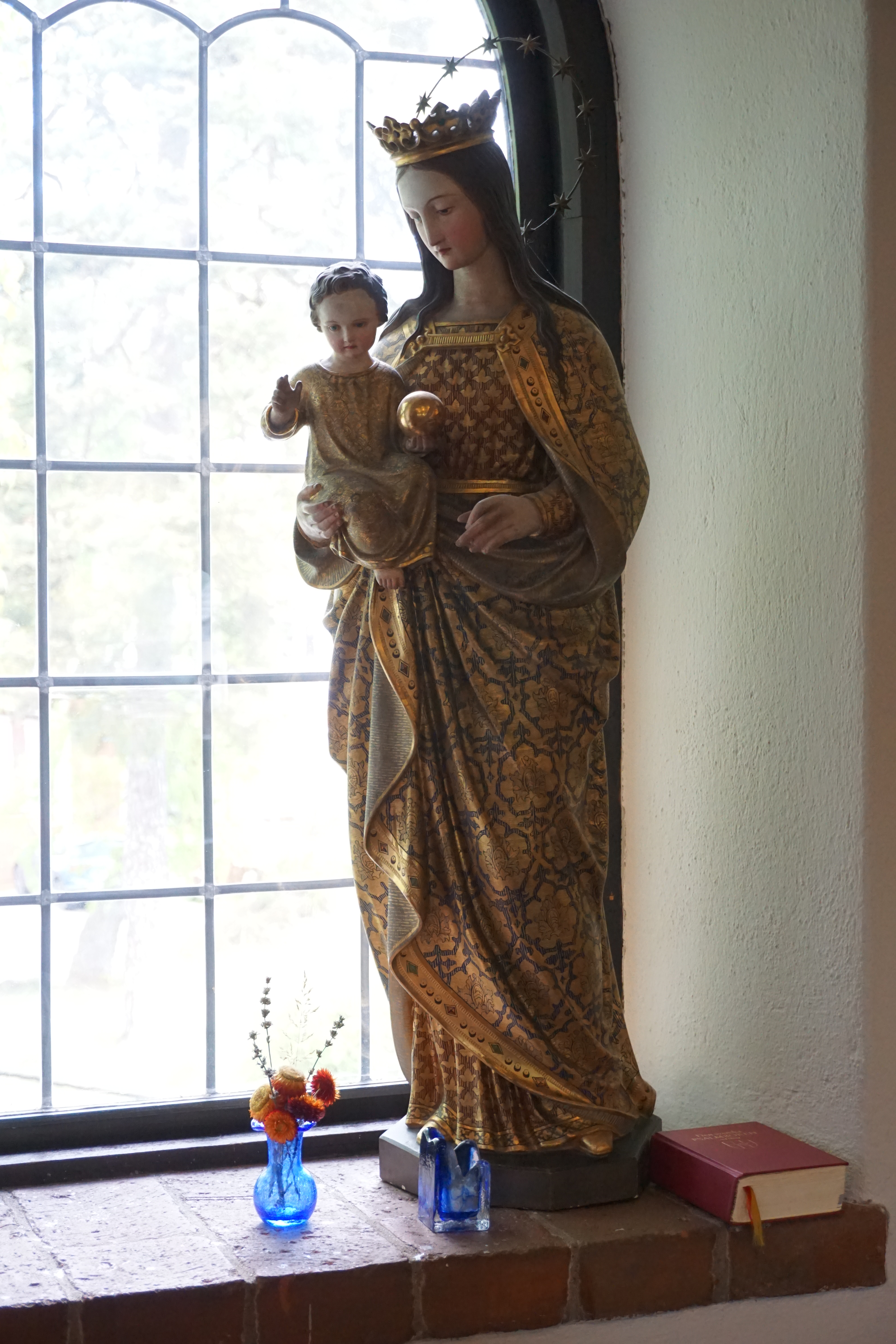
A statue of the Madonna with Christ Child (1915) at Enskede Evangelical-Lutheran Church in Stockholm, Sweden

== Islamic view ==
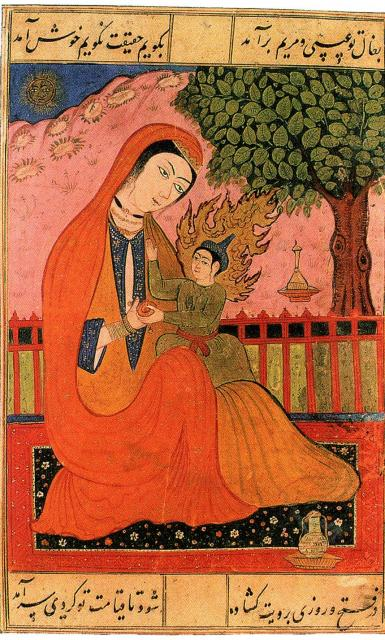
Mary and Jesus in a Persian miniature

The first important encounter between Islam and the image of the Madonna is said to have happened during the Prophet Muhammad's conquest of Mecca. At the culmination of his mission, in 629 CE, Muhammad conquered Mecca with a Muslim army, with his first action being the "cleansing" or "purifying" of the Kaaba, wherein he removed all the pre-Islamic pagan images and idols from inside the temple. According to reports collected by Ibn Ishaq and al-Azraqi, Muhammad did, however, protectively put his hand over a painting of Mary and Jesus, and a fresco of Abraham in order to keep them from being effaced. In the words of the historian Barnaby Rogerson, "Muhammad raised his hand to protect an icon of the Virgin and Child and a painting of Abraham, but otherwise his companions cleared the interior of its clutter of votive treasures, cult implements, statuettes and hanging charms."

The Islamic scholar Martin Lings narrated the event thus in his biography of the Prophet: "Christians sometimes came to do honour to the Sanctuary of Abraham, and they were made welcome like all the rest. Moreover one Christian had been allowed and even encouraged to paint an icon of the Virgin Mary and the child Christ on an inside wall of the Ka'bah, where it sharply contrasted with all the other paintings. But Quraysh were more or less insensitive to this contrast: for them it was simply a question of increasing the multitude of idols by another two; and it was partly their tolerance that made them so impenetrable.... Apart from the icon of the Virgin Mary and the child Jesus, and a painting of an old man, said to be Abraham, the walls inside had been covered with pictures of pagan deities. Placing his hand protectively over the icon, the Prophet told Uthman to see that all the other paintings, except that of Abraham, were effaced."

== Parallels in Indian art ==
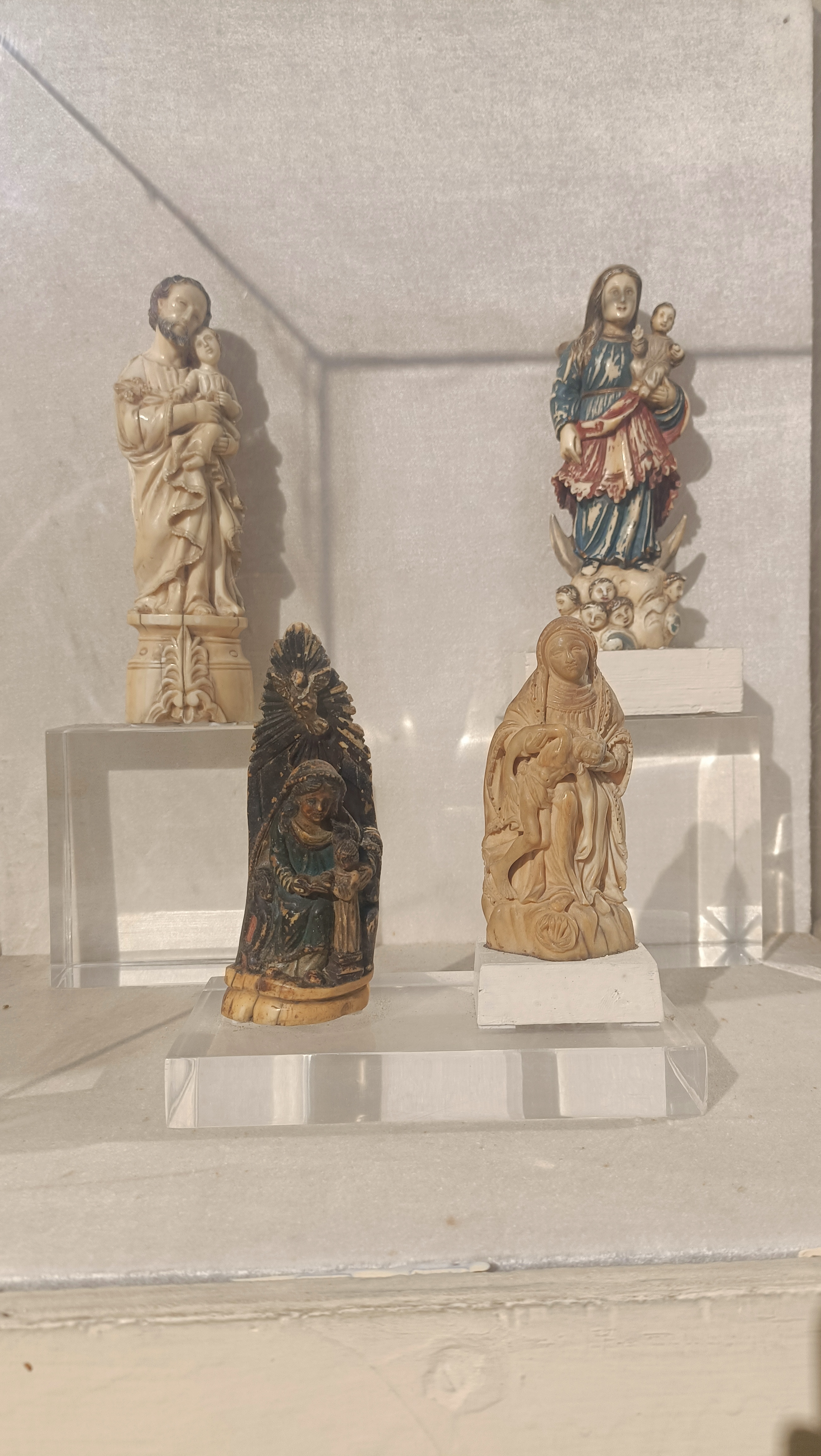
Carved Ivory Objects from Goa, 18th/19th Century. National Museum, New Delhi

In Indian art there are striking similarities found in between the images of Madonna and Christ Child, and Yashoda or Devaki and Krishna, as both the Hindu and the Christian figures of the "eternal child" are shown cuddled warmly on the laps of their mother.

There also exists a temple in Goa, the Shree Devakikrishna Temple at Marcel, where seeing the idol of Krishna-Devaki, the Portuguese had not decimated the temple, for it had reminded them of Virgin Mary-Jesus.

"An impressive idol of Devaki, carrying the infant lord on her waist, stands at the inner sanctum of the temple. The image is unusual because while there exists a plethora of temples in the country dedicated to Krishna, there is no image of Devaki". Historian Anant Dhume, in his book 'The Cultural History of Goa from 10,000 BC to 1352 AD', compares the idol with the image of Madonna and the Christ child because of the similarities.

In the book, Dhume elaborates: "However, the idol of Devkikrishna originally of Chodan Island, Tiswadi taluka transferred at the time of molestation by the Christian missionaries to Mashela (Marcela in Portuguese) hamlet of Orgaon village, Ponda taluka, is interesting ... History says that Vasco da Gama in his old age was appointed Vice-Roy of all colonies of the Far East as a gesture of honour. One day, he visited Chodan Island. When he saw this idol through the main doorway, he immediately saluted the image and went on his knees, considering it the image of Mother Mary, with baby Jesus ..."

During the Portuguese reign in Goa starting from the 16th Century, the Indo-Portuguese ivory statuettes made, reflected such similarities. "The Portuguese had settled with the aim to dominate the spice trade and spread their Christian faith, and these small, portable ivory statues would embellish the church altars and Goan homes, and were also transported abroad serving to fulfil their later project. These figurines were carved by the Indian artists under the guidance of the Jesuits". Art historian Gauvin Alexander Bailey notes that the Jesuit art commissions "were . . . a partnership in which the artists' own interpretations of sacred art were encouraged and fostered." The Jesuits sourced small paintings, prints and sculptures from Europe for the Indian sculptors to use as reference, and the indigenous artists used their own traditions for fashioning such figures. One of the most brilliant example of this syncretic form is the figure called the Good Shepherd Rockery (also known as the Good Shepherd Mount or Bom Pastor) which "displays the coming together of cultures in both its iconography and its features, encapsulating how Goan sculptors created images of the divine that are Catholic, European, and South Asian". The child form of Christ in this figure, with round face and smooth skin were perhaps drawn from sculptures of baby Krishna.

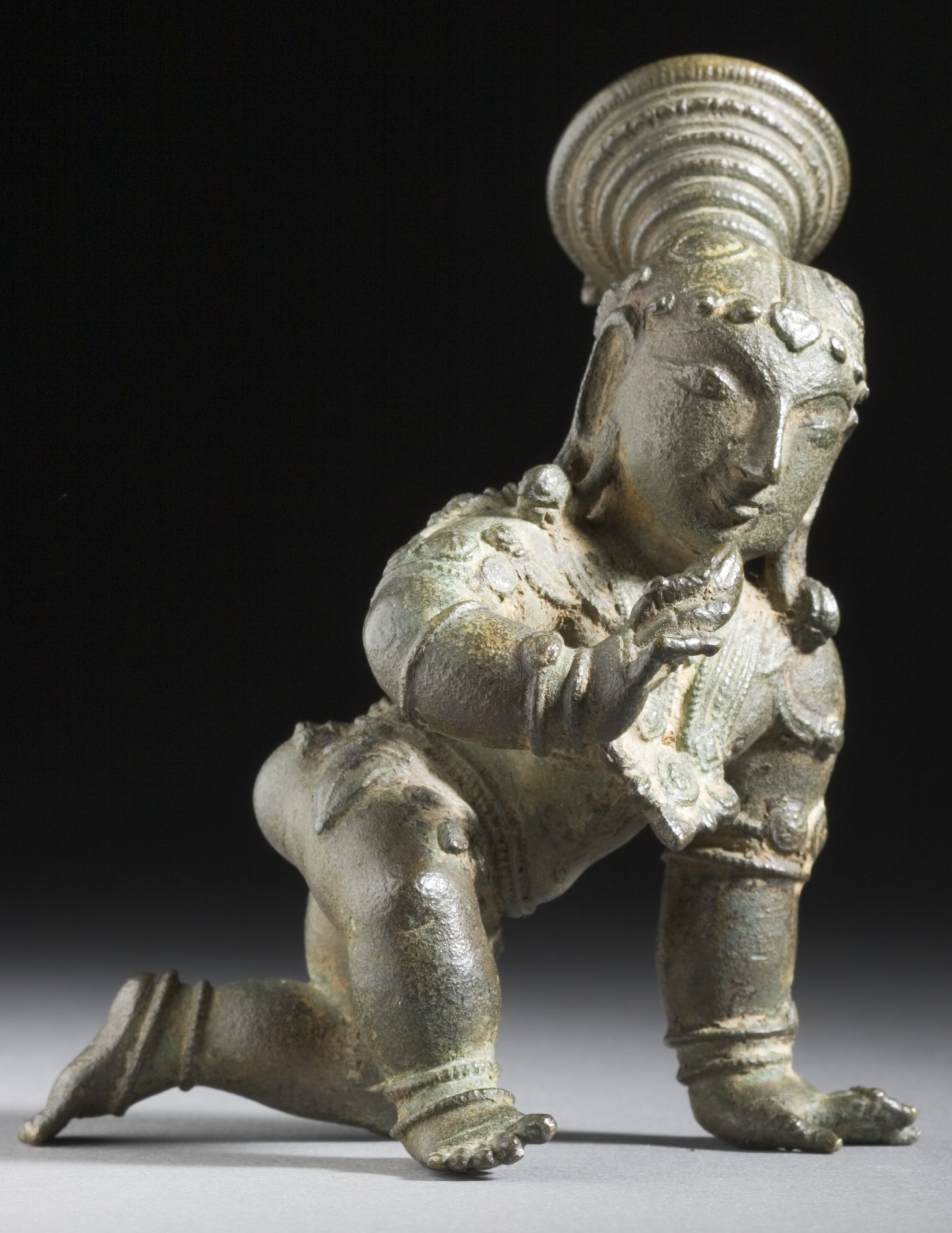
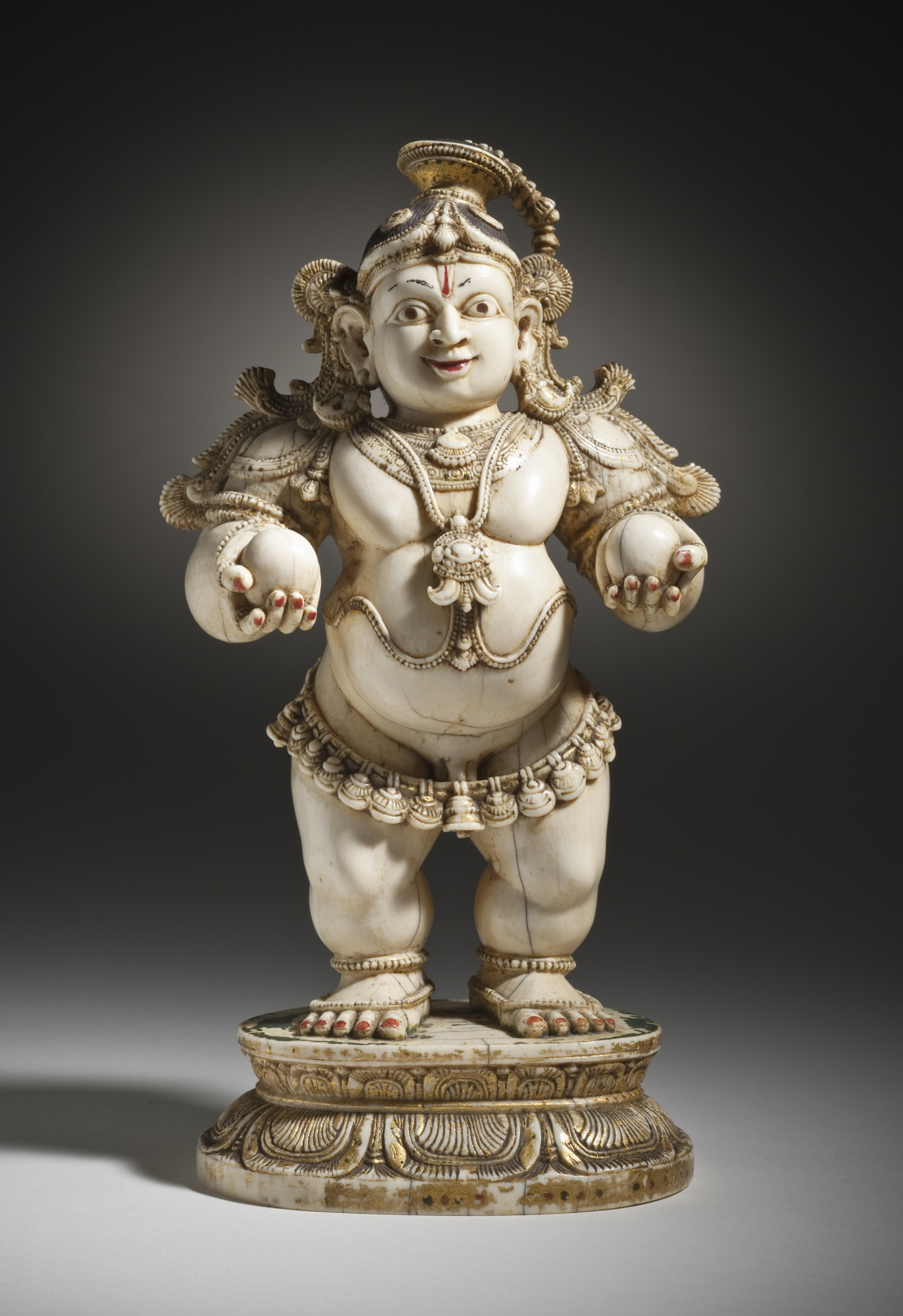
Icons of Navanita-Krishna or Krishna, The Butter Thief, circulating in 16th century South India, like the copper alloy made statue from Tamil Nadu (left) and the ivory statue from southern Karnataka(right), both currently at LACMA, were utilised by Christian artists in Portuguese-ruled Goa to produce the icons of the infant Christ.

Whereas, in Bengal, the Chore Bagan Art Studio, the Kansaripara Art Studio and the Calcutta Art Studio, produced homegrown prints around the second half of the nineteenth century. These artists, were influenced by the various depictions of Christ in the European prints which had infiltrated the market of the time. And perhaps the closest connection they could draw was between the child Christ and Krishna. Jyotindra Jain comments: "... the Chore Bagan Art Studio published a popular picture, titled Birth Of Krishna, which was almost entirely based on popular prints of The Birth Of Jesus Christ, to the extent that the presence of three wise men of the East was also literally imitated in this work."

Artists such as Jamini Roy also adopted this image, and Jesus and Mary would feature in the canvases of Tyeb Mehta, Krishnen Khanna, Madhvi Parekh and others in ways that provide a commentary on, and glimpse of the Indian social scene. Churches in India, such as Tamil Nadu's Sanctuary of Our Lady of Vailankanni which was deemed a basilica by the Roman Catholic Church in 1962, similarly housed idols of Mary clad in a traditional saree. "These remain examples of how in art and in faith traditions merge, so do symbols and images, giving birth to syncretic cultures that testify the ravages of communal hate, man-made differences and orthodox interpretations". Nirendranath Chakraborty, one of the finest modern poets of Bengal wrote, taking forward this imagery of the mother and the child, wrote a famous poem entitled "Kolkatar Jishu" (The Jesus of Calcutta).

The everlasting tenderness of the mother-child figure, of motherhood and the unconditional bond of love and warmth that this relationship holds, "that the Christ child on Madonna's lap signifies and is reverberated in the image of Krishna-Yashoda or Devaki, is perhaps what marks the culture of love", and justifies the various interpretations of this symbol in art and poetry found across the subcontinent.

== Notable types and individual works ==
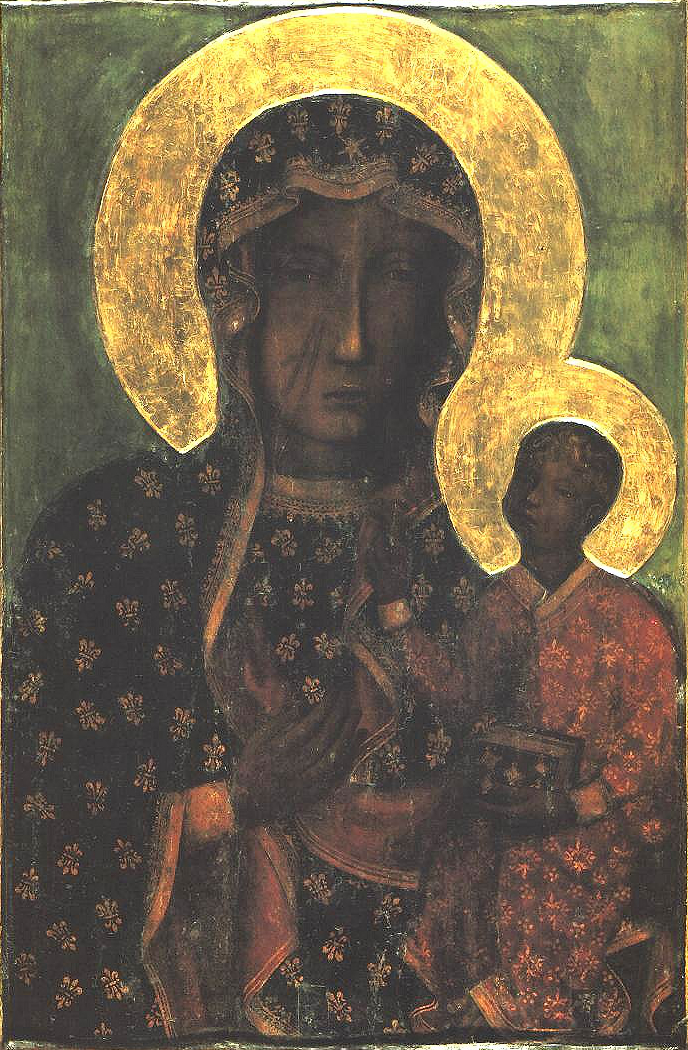
Black Madonna of Częstochowa, Poland

There are a large number of articles on individual works of various sorts in Category:Virgin Mary in art and its sub-category. See also the incomplete List of depictions of the Virgin and Child. The term "Madonna" is often applied to representations of Mary that were not created by Italians. A small selection of examples include:

- Golden Madonna of Essen, the earliest large-scale sculptural example in Western Europe and a precedent for the polychrome wooden processional sculptures of Romanesque France, a type known as Throne of Wisdom
- Madonna of humility, depicting a Madonna sitting on the ground, or low cushions
- Madonna and Child, a painting by Duccio di Buoninsegna, from around the year 1300
- The Black Madonna of Częstochowa (Czarna Madonna or Matka Boska Częstochowska in Polish) icon, which was, according to legend, painted by St. Luke the Evangelist on a cypress table top from the house of the Holy Family
- Madonna and Child with Flowers, possibly one of two works begun by Leonardo da Vinci
- Madonna Eleusa (of tenderness) has been depicted both in the Eastern and Western churches.
- Madonna of the Steps, a relief by Michelangelo
- Madonna della seggiola, by Raphael
- Madonna with the Long Neck, by Parmigianino
- The Madonna of Port Lligat, the name of two paintings by Salvador Dalí created in 1949 and 1950

=== Paintings ===
Madonna in Art

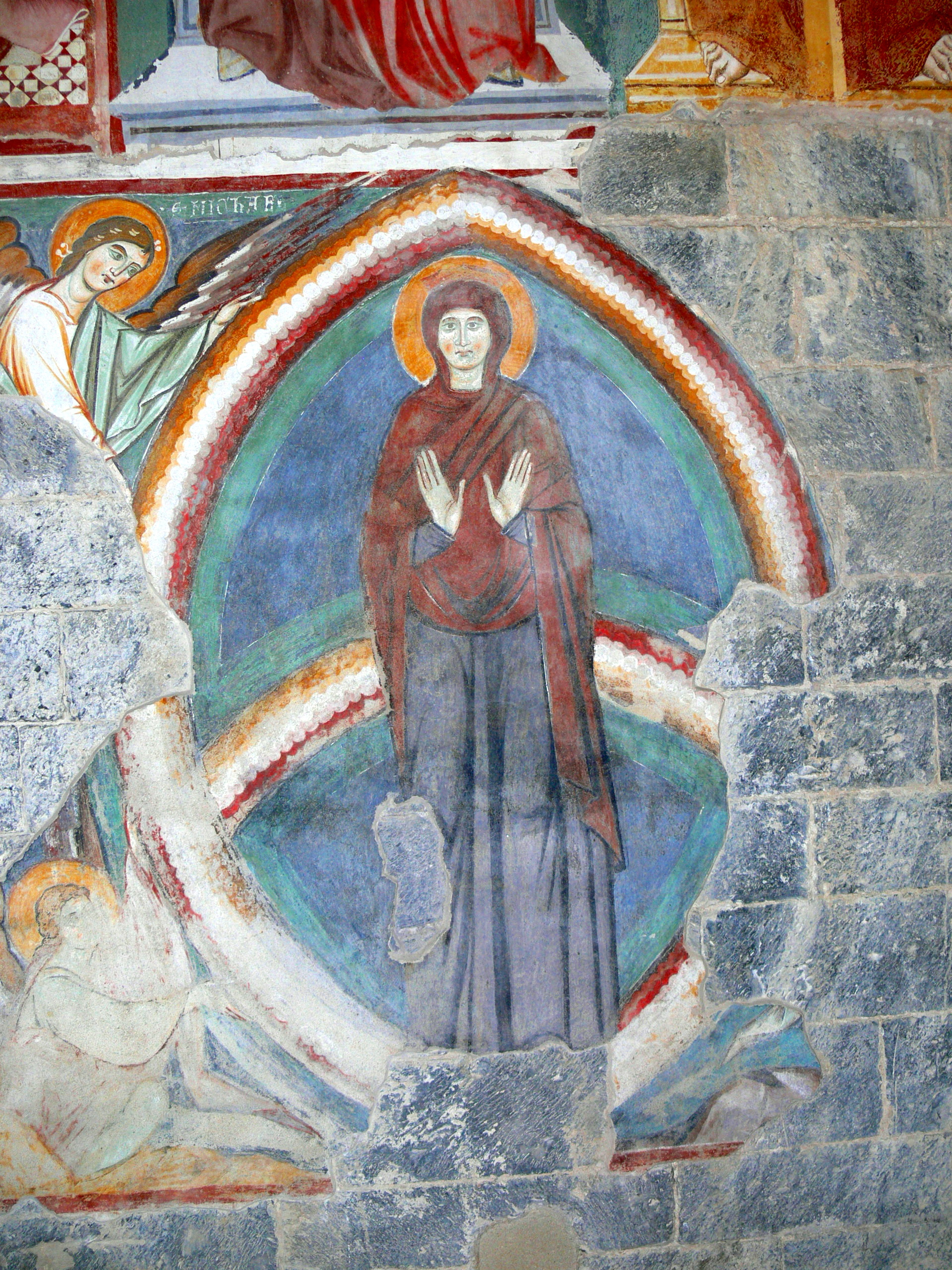
Madonna in Mandorla, Wolfgang Sauber, 12th century

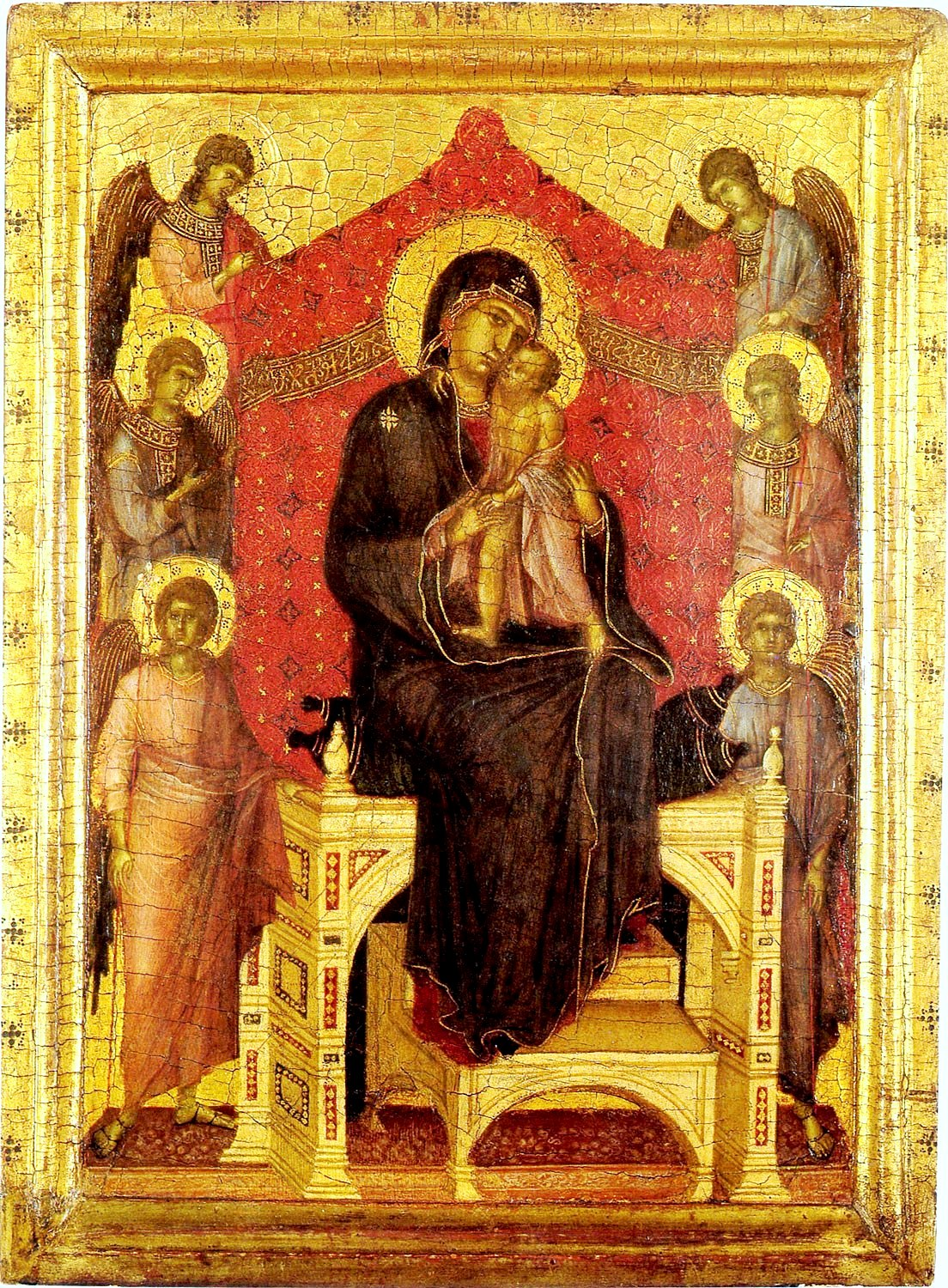
Madonna and Angels, Duccio, 1282

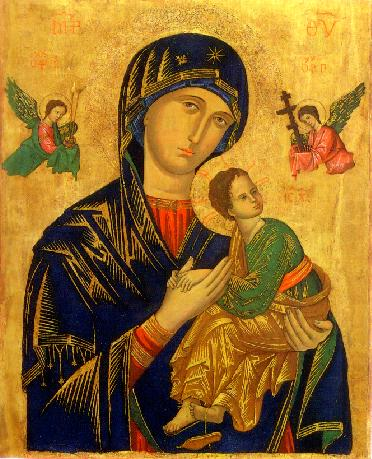
Our Mother of Perpetual Help, probably an early Cretan work, 13th or 14th century. A very popular Catholic image, which was certainly in Rome by 1499.

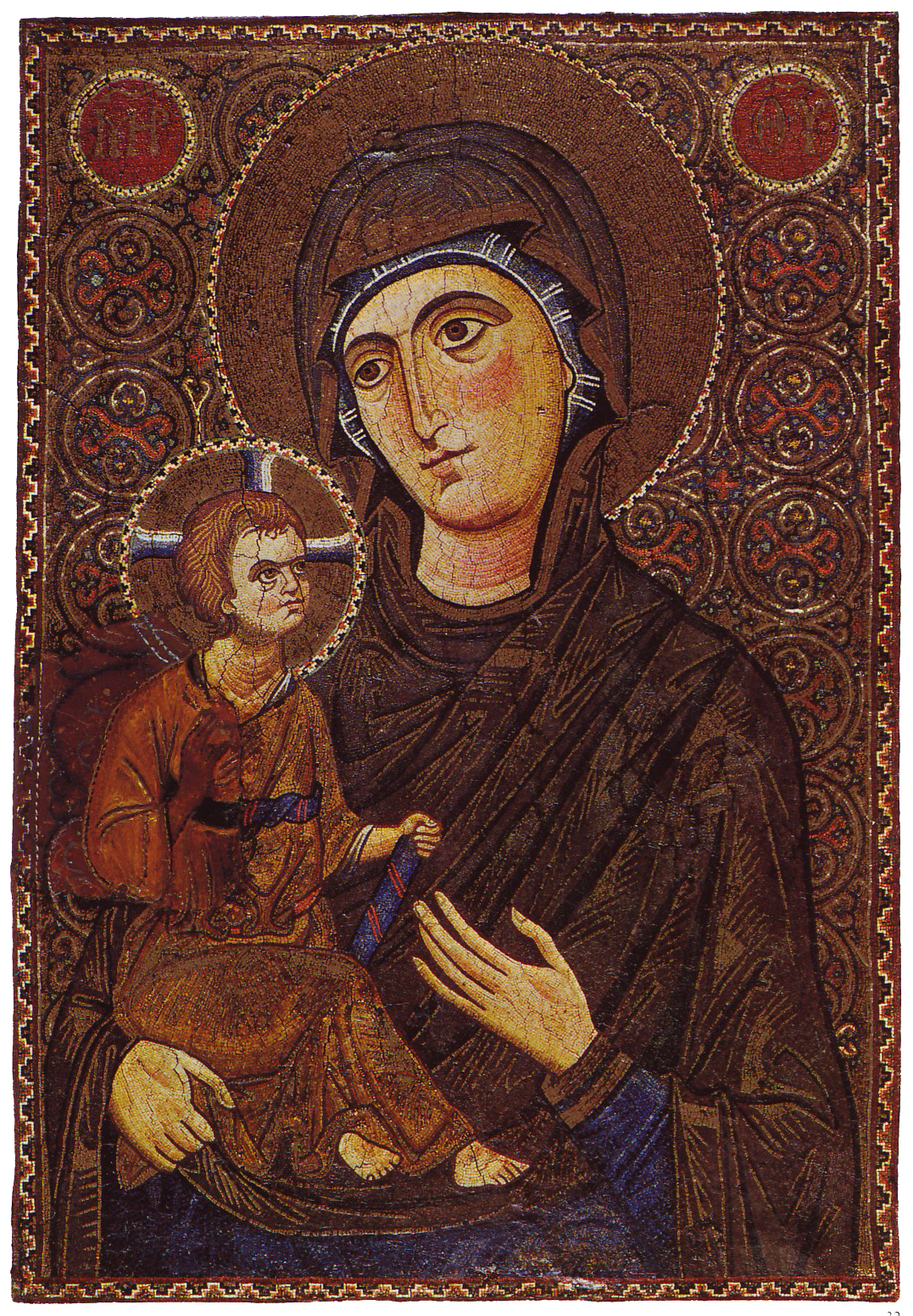
Mary and the child depicted as a hodegetria. Tesselated icon in monumental style, early 13th century. Saint Catherine's Monastery in the Sinai, Egypt.

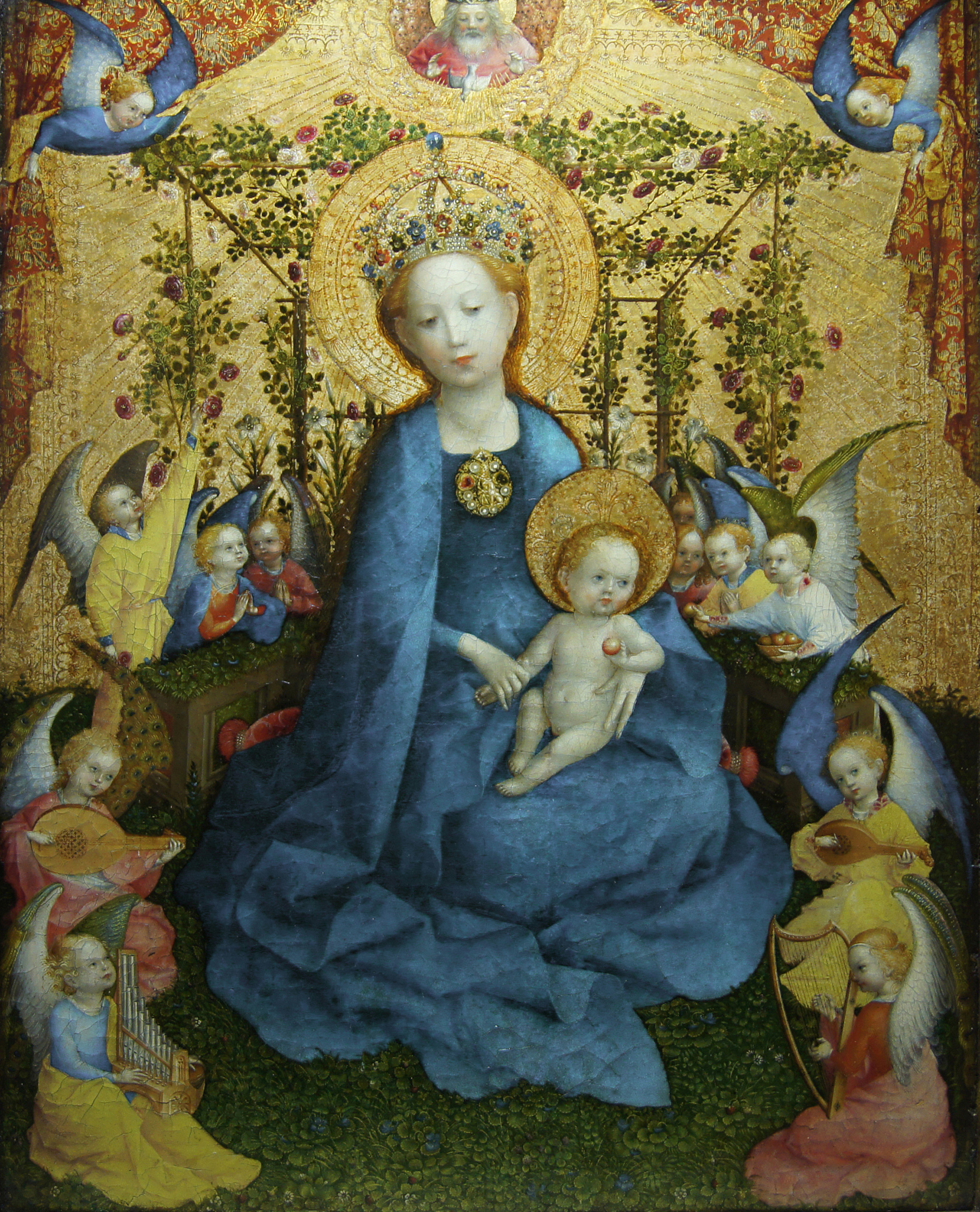
Madonna in the rose-garden by Stefan Lochner, 1448

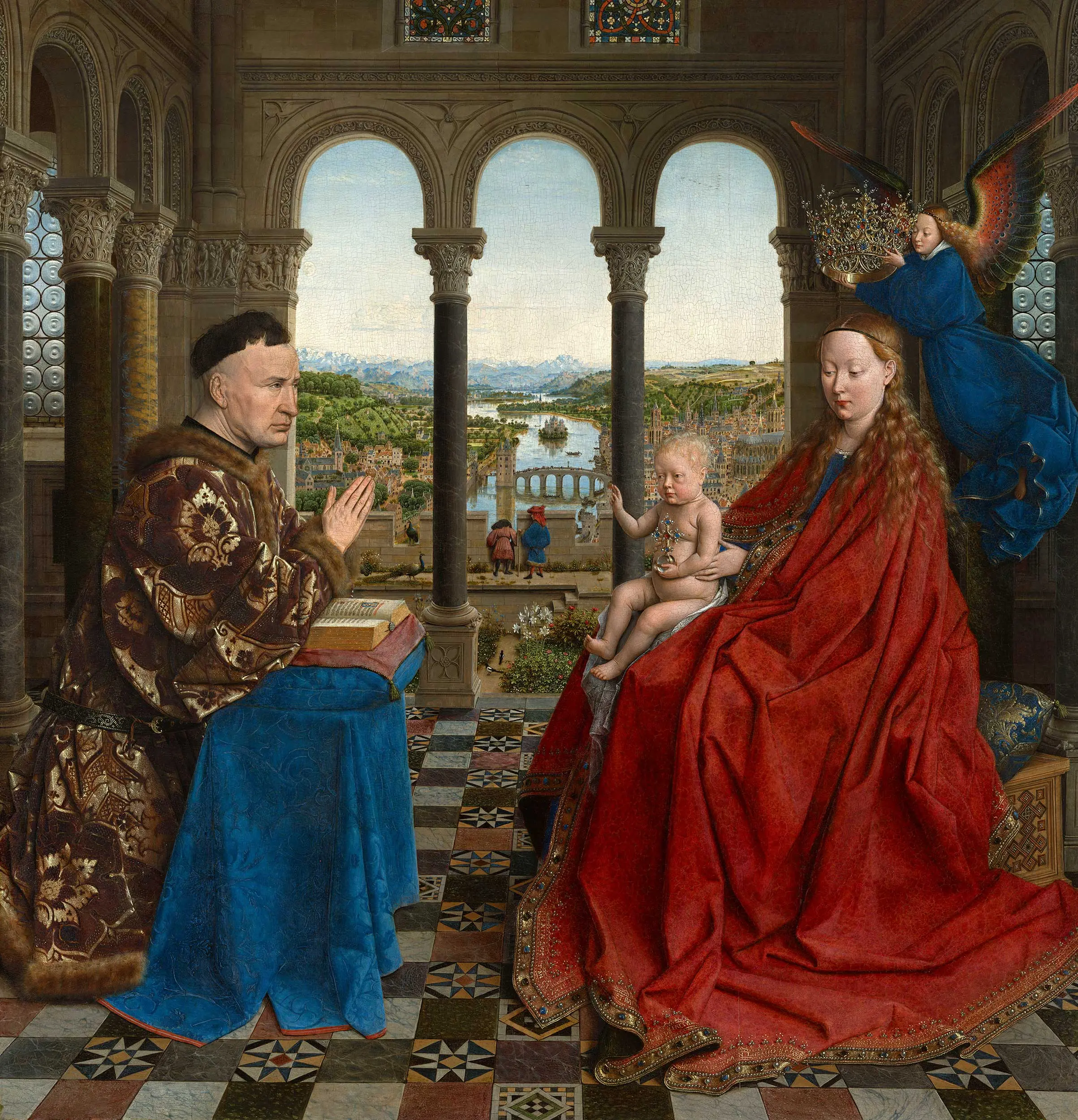
Madonna of Chancellor Rolin, Jan van Eyck, Burgundy, c. 1435

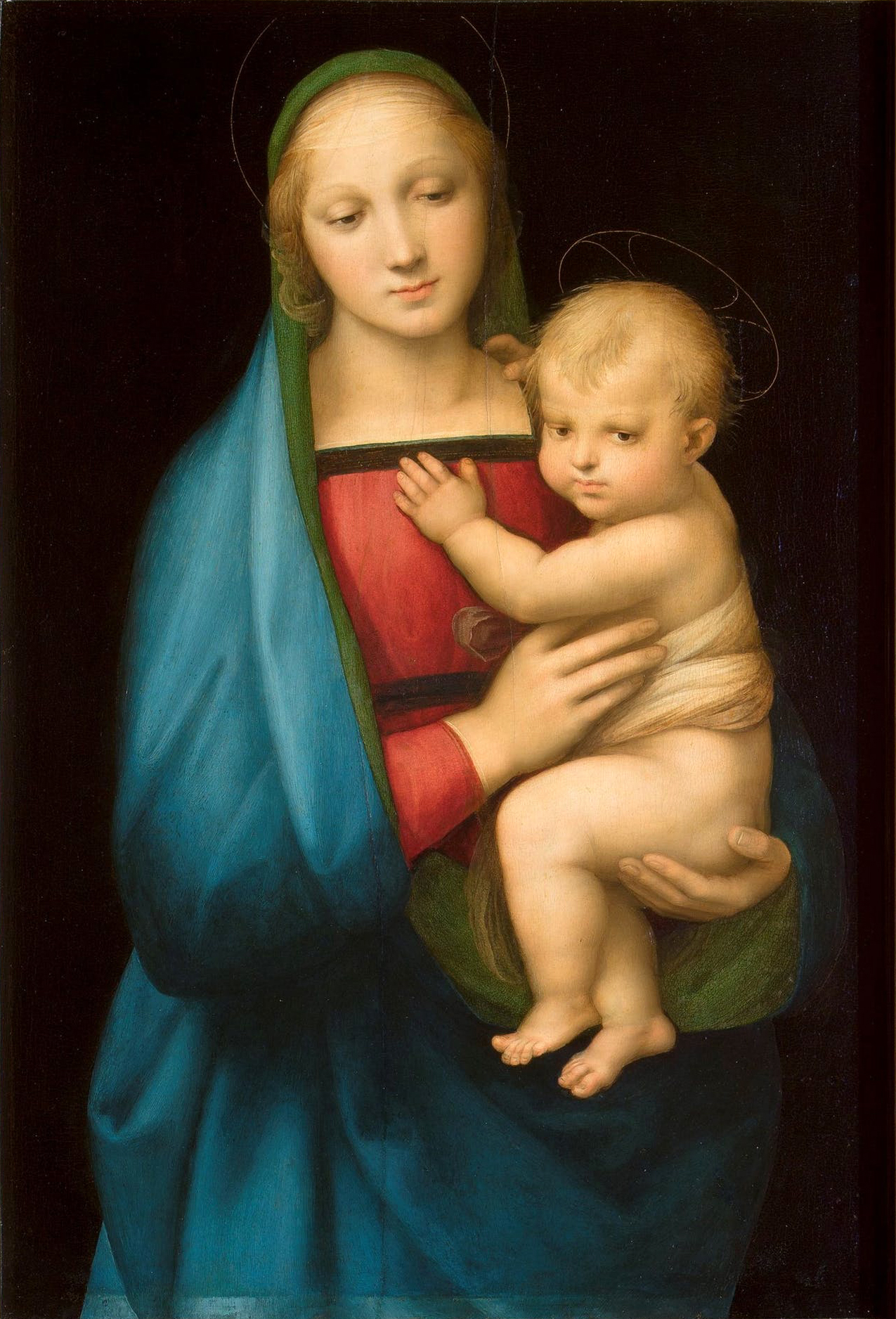
Madonna del Granduca, Raphael, 1505

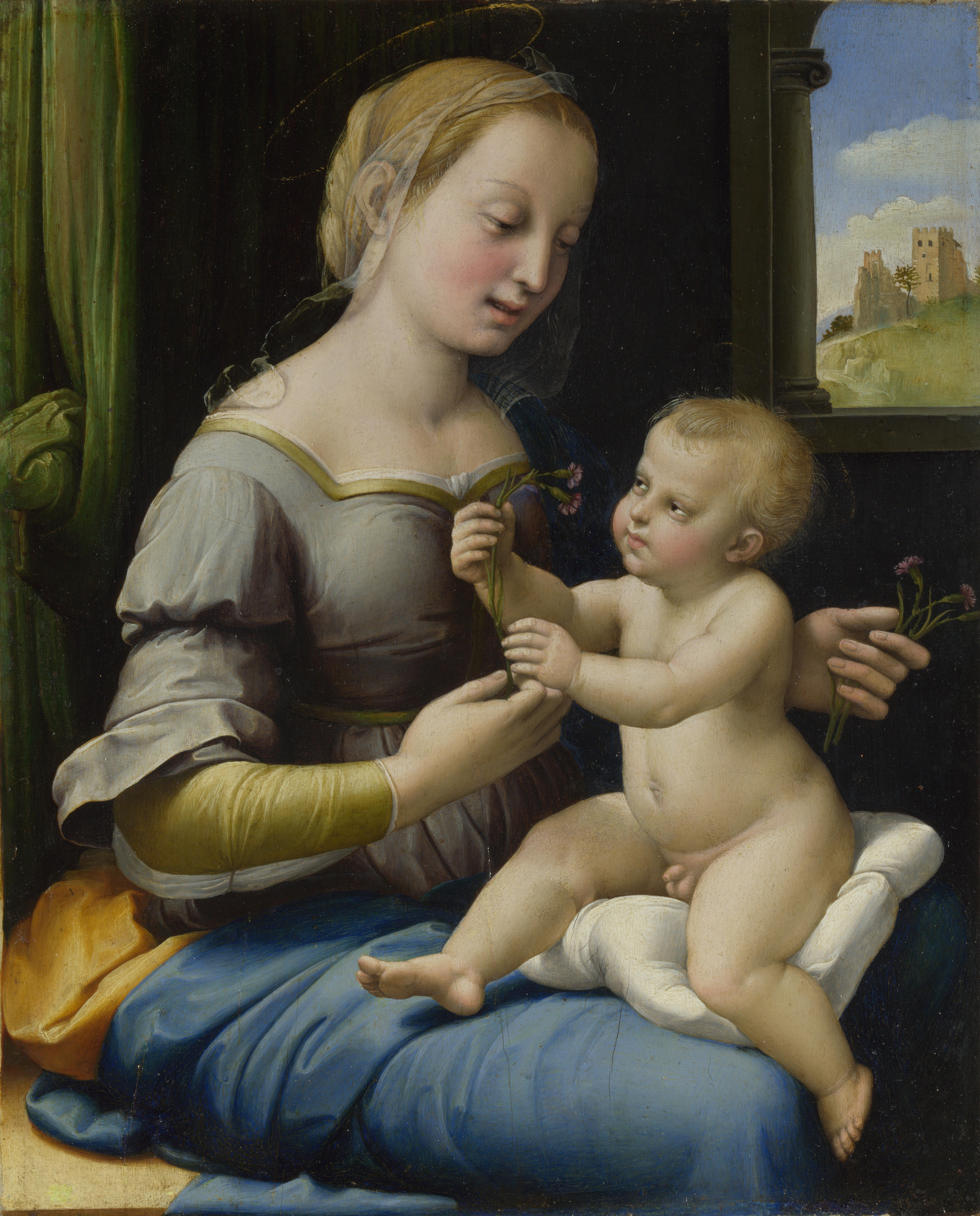
Madonna of the Pinks, Raphael, probably before 1507

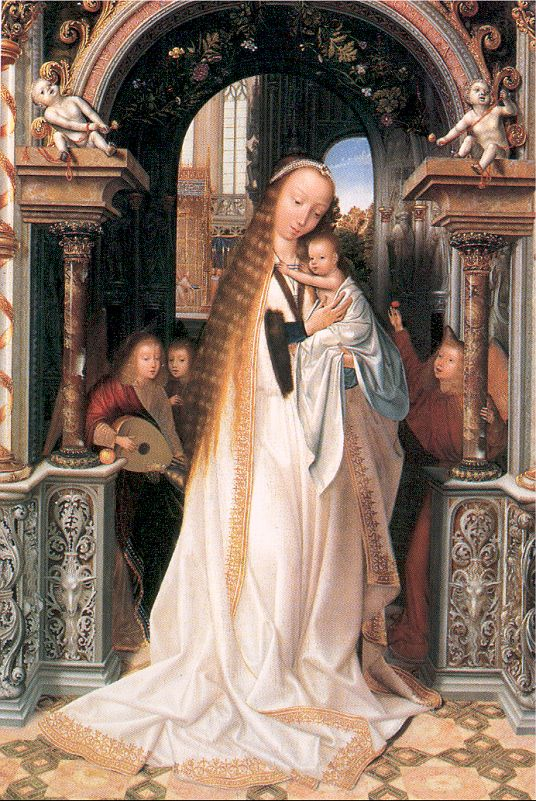
Madonna and Child Surrounded by Angels by Quentin Matsys, c. 1509

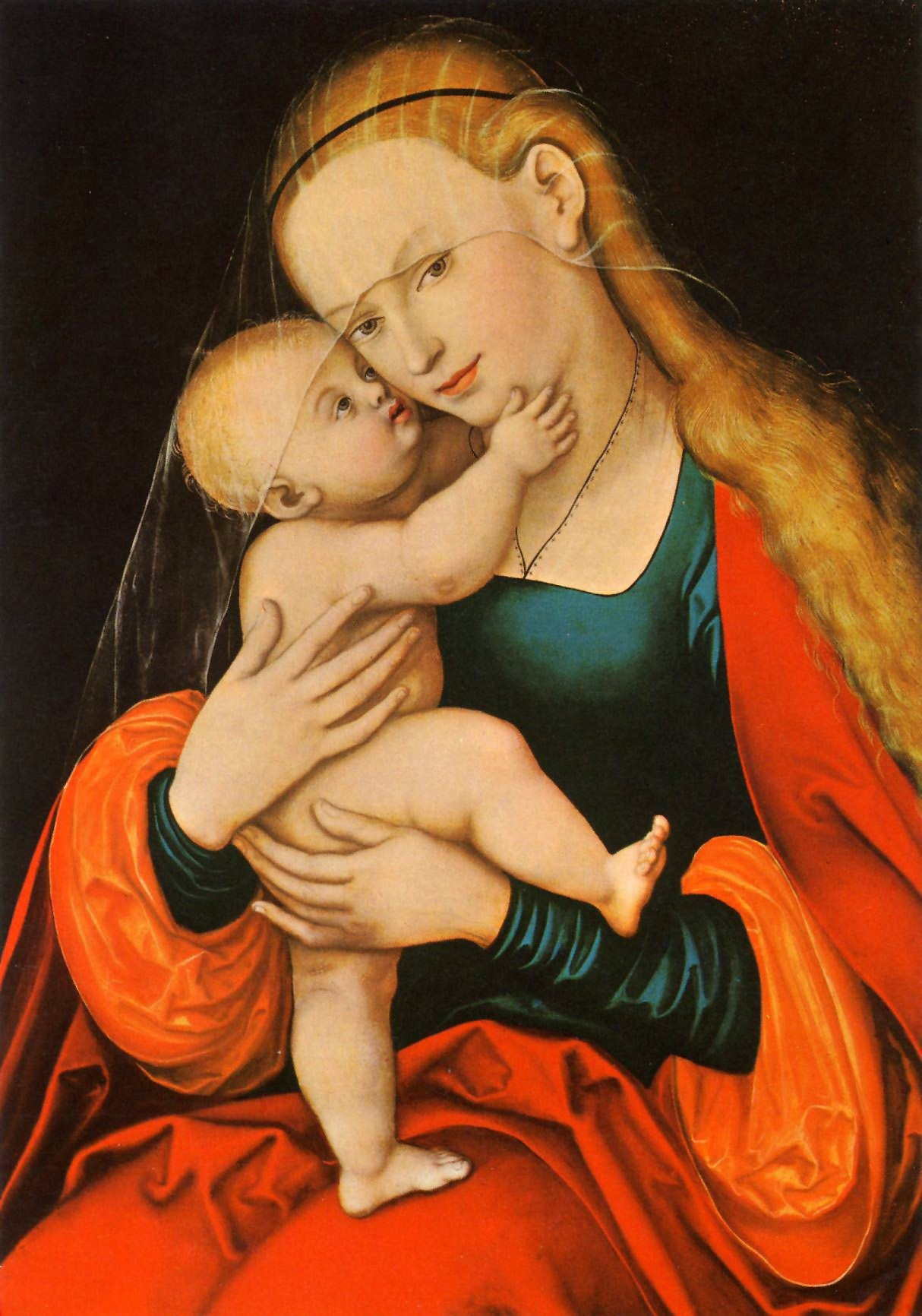
Maria Hilf by Lucas Cranach the Elder, c. 1530

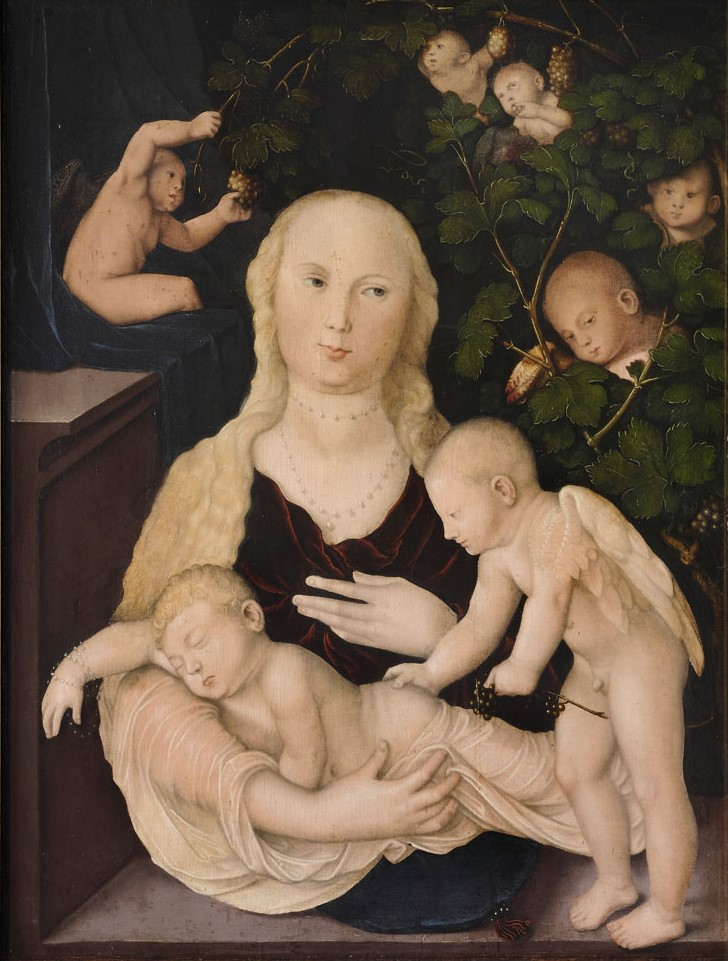
Madonna in the Vine Arbour by Hans Baldung, c. 1541 (Musée de l'Œuvre Notre-Dame, Strasbourg)

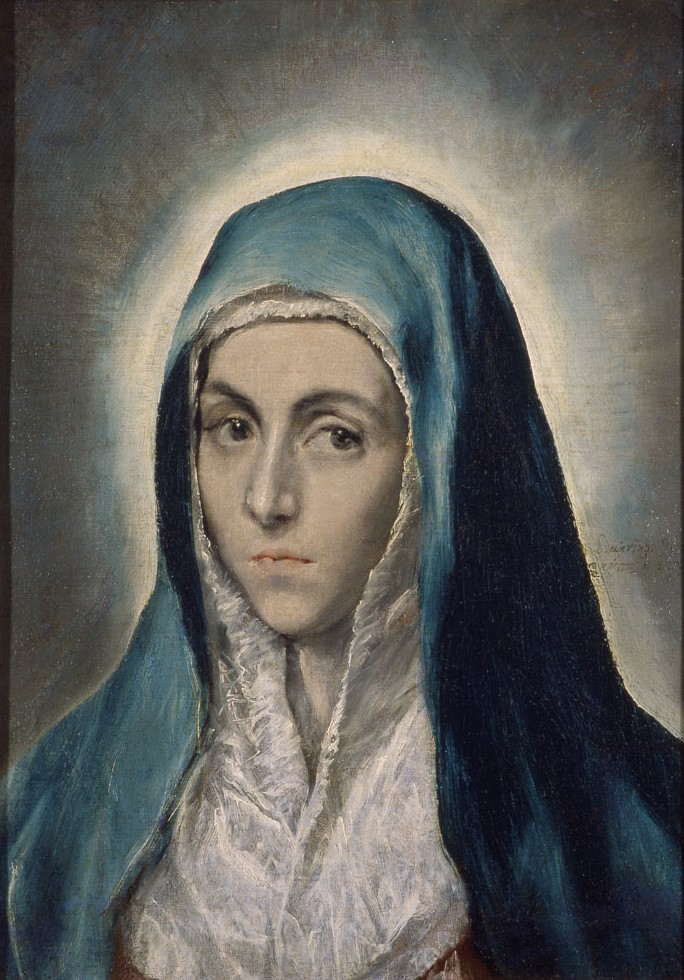
Virgin Mary by El Greco, c. 1600 (Musée des Beaux-Arts de Strasbourg)

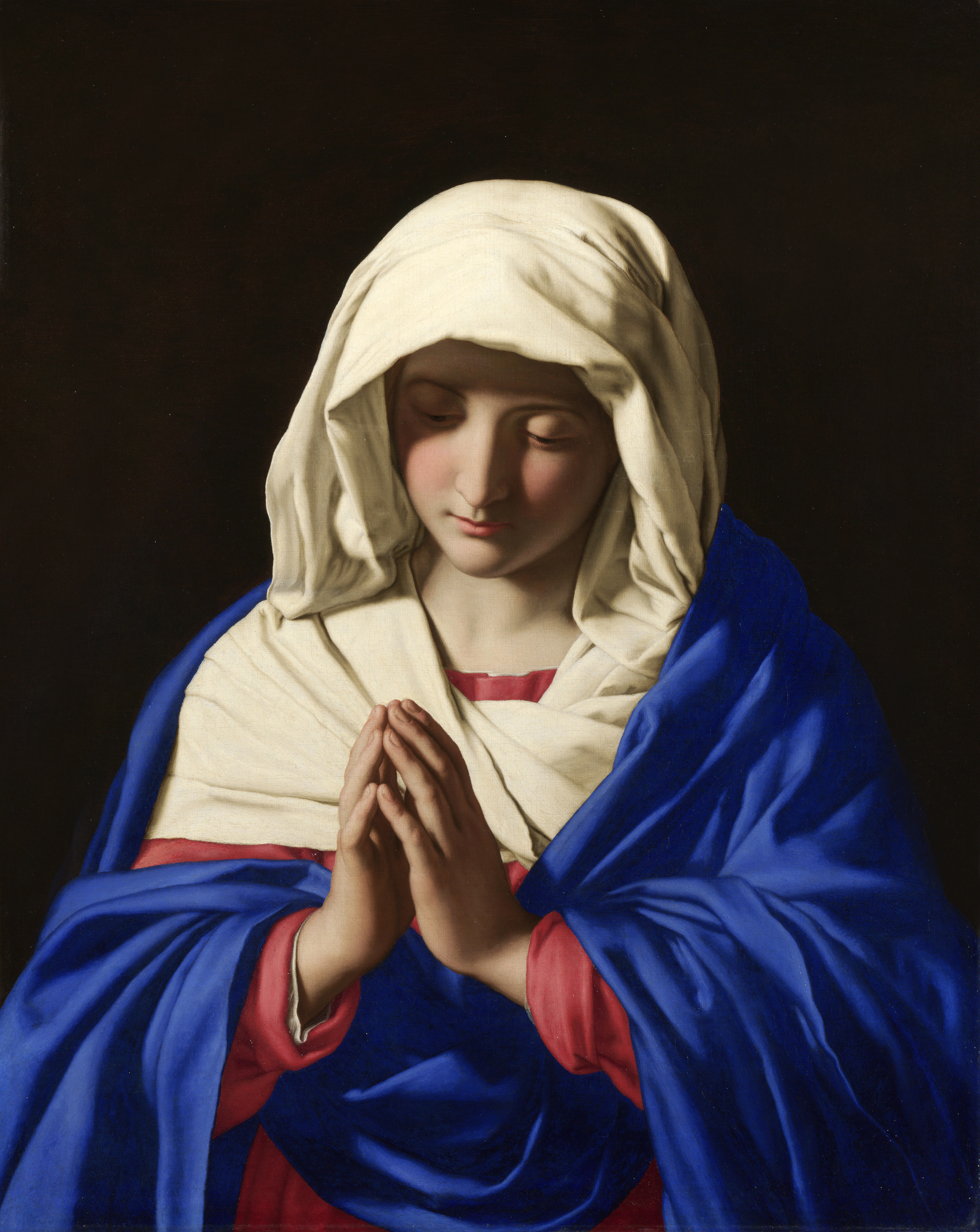
The Virgin in Prayer by Sassoferrato, 1640–1650. National Gallery, London.

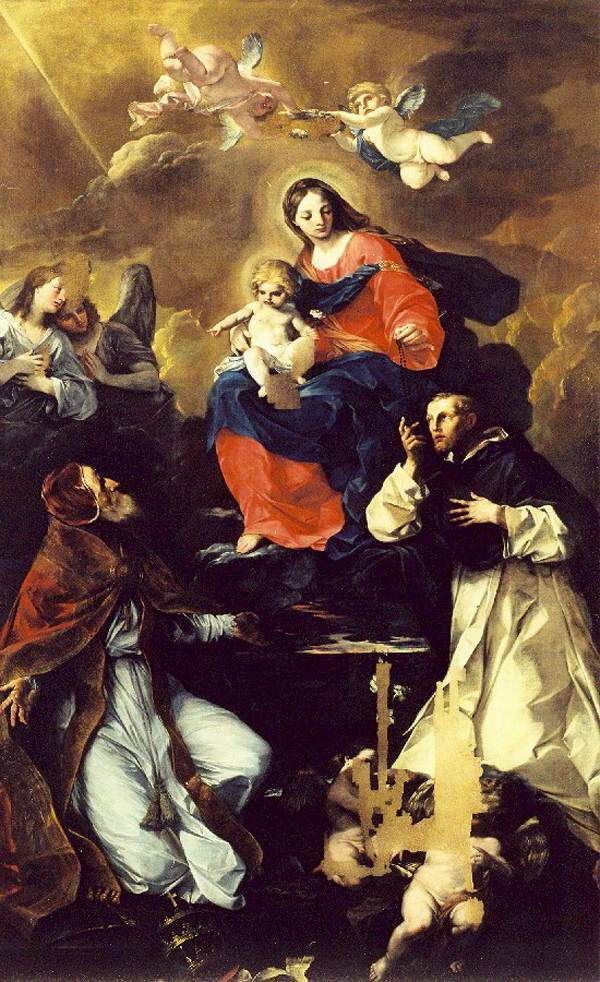
Virgin and Child with Angels and Saints, Felice Torelli, 17th century

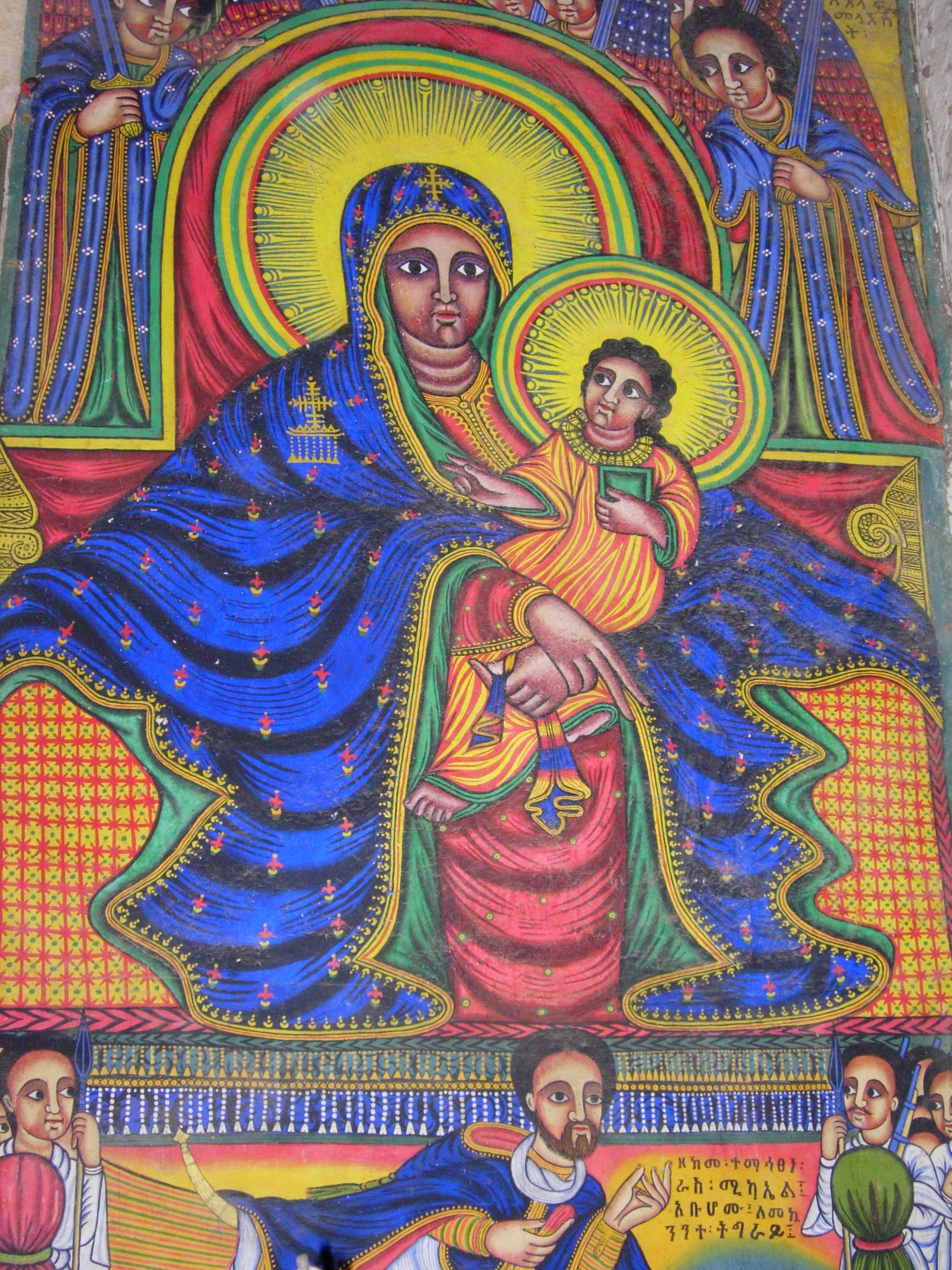
A fresco of a black Madonna and Jesus at the Church of Our Lady Mary of Zion in Axum, Ethiopia

=== Statues ===
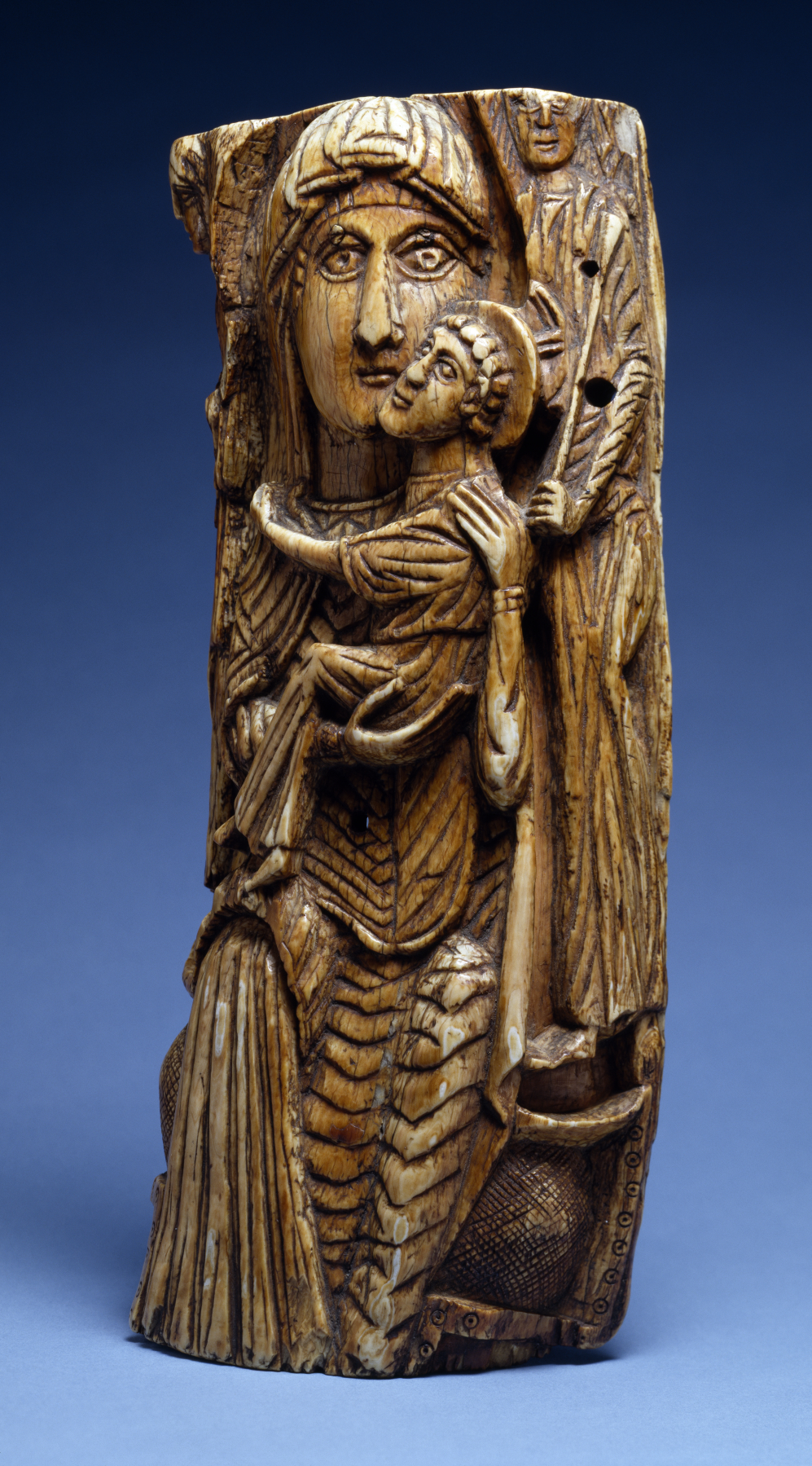
Egyptian ivory carving, one of the earliest examples of what in later Byzantine times was called Eleousa, or "Virgin of Tenderness". 7th century.

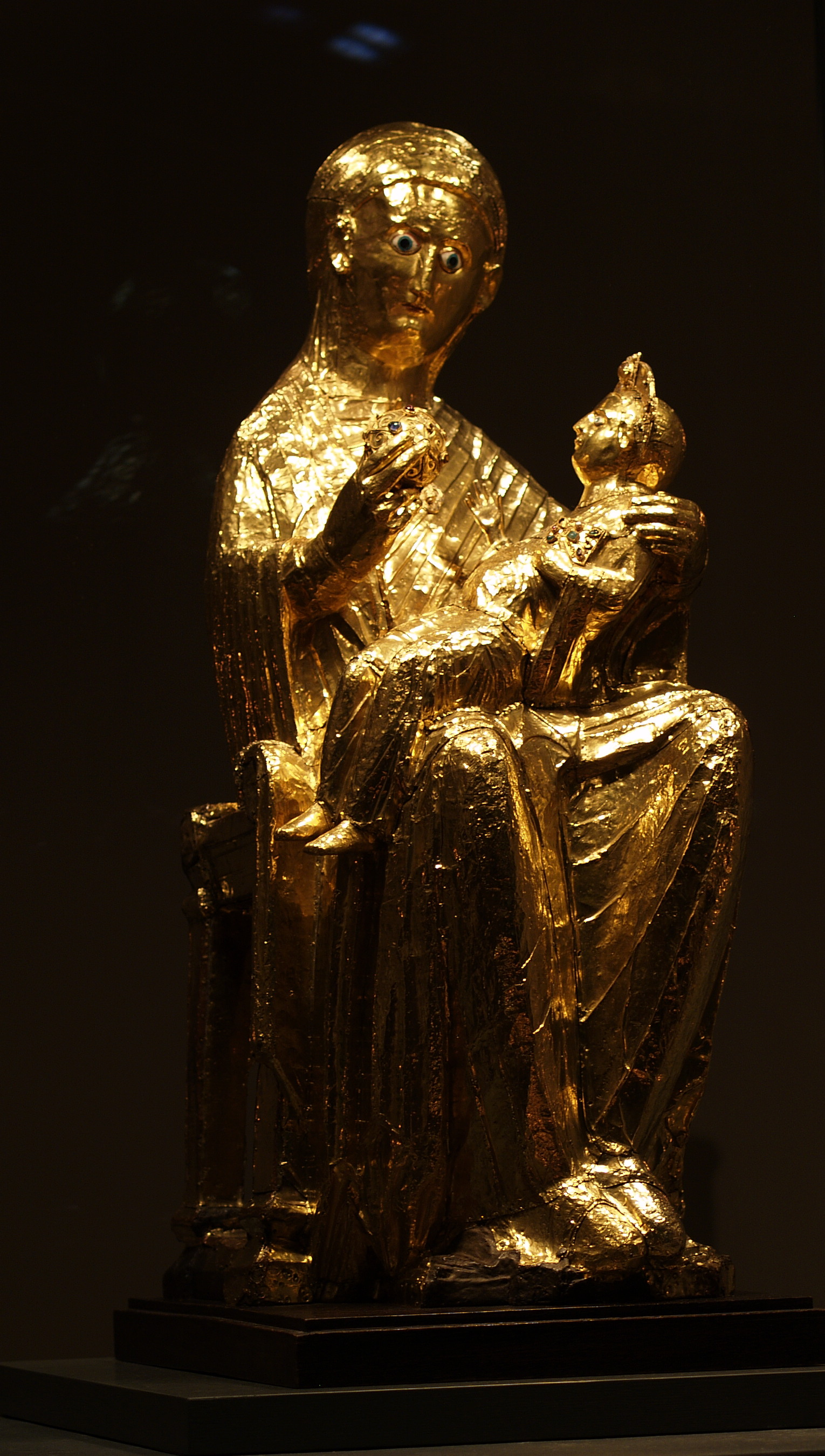
Golden Madonna of Essen, c. 980

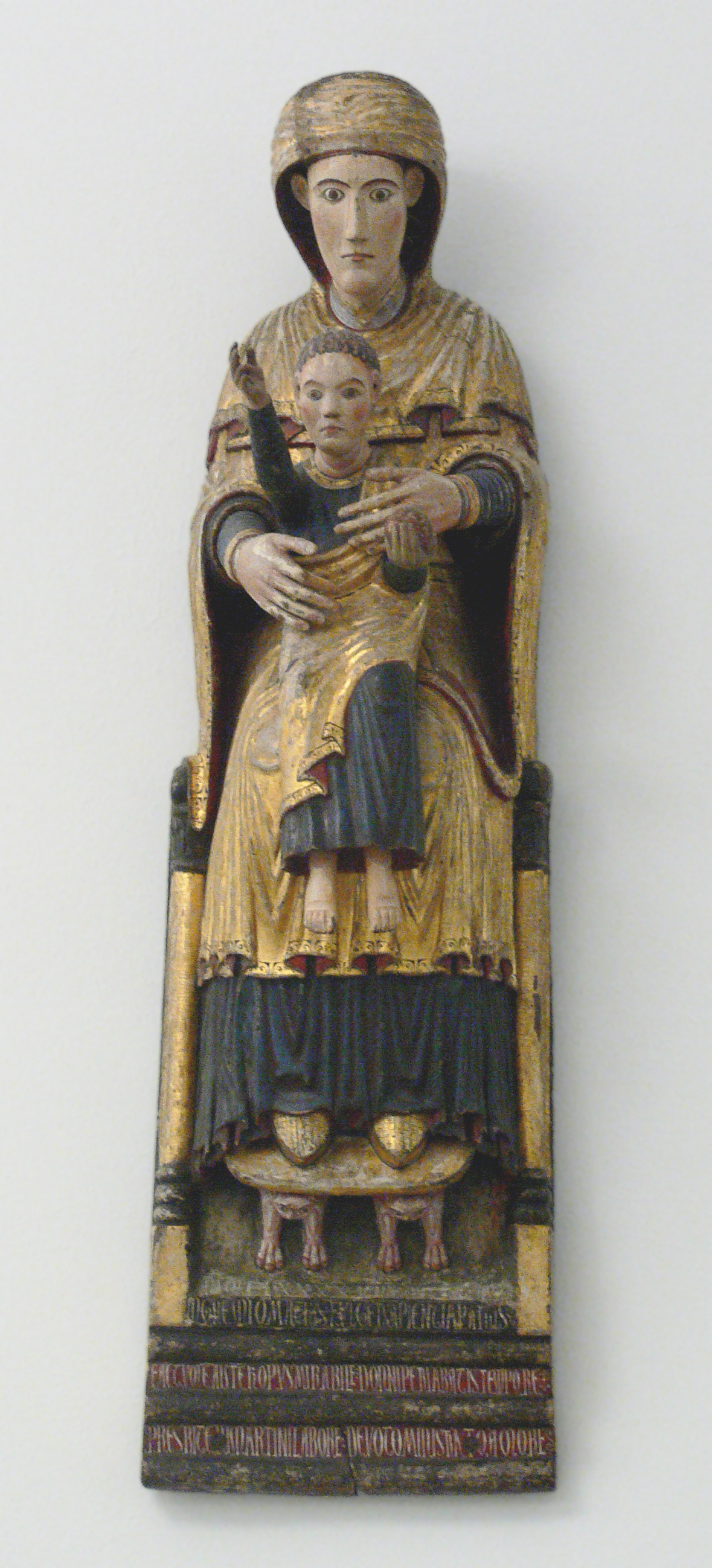
Presbyter Martinus: Madonna as Seat of Wisdom, Italy, 1199

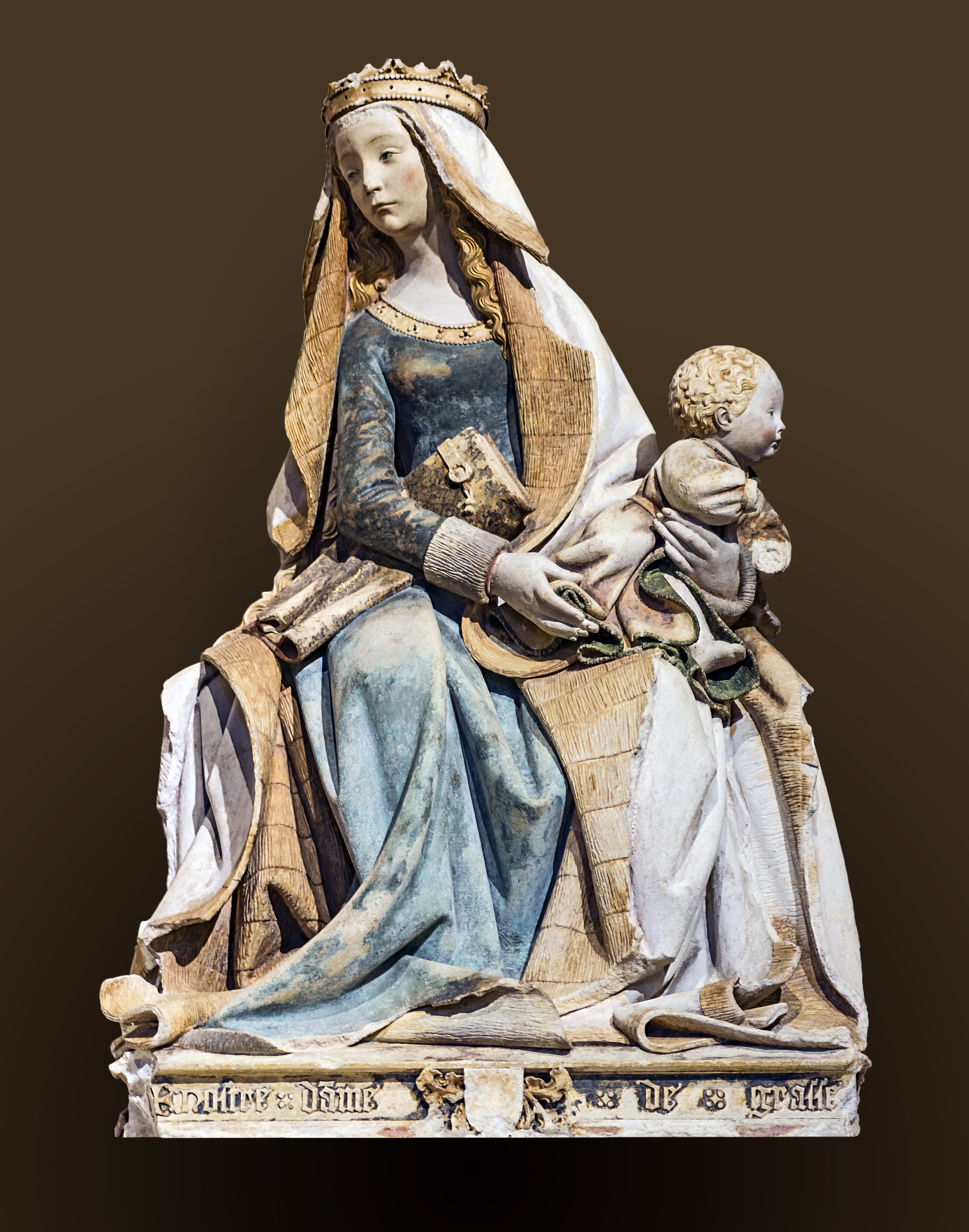
Nostre Dame de Grasse, Toulouse, c. 1480

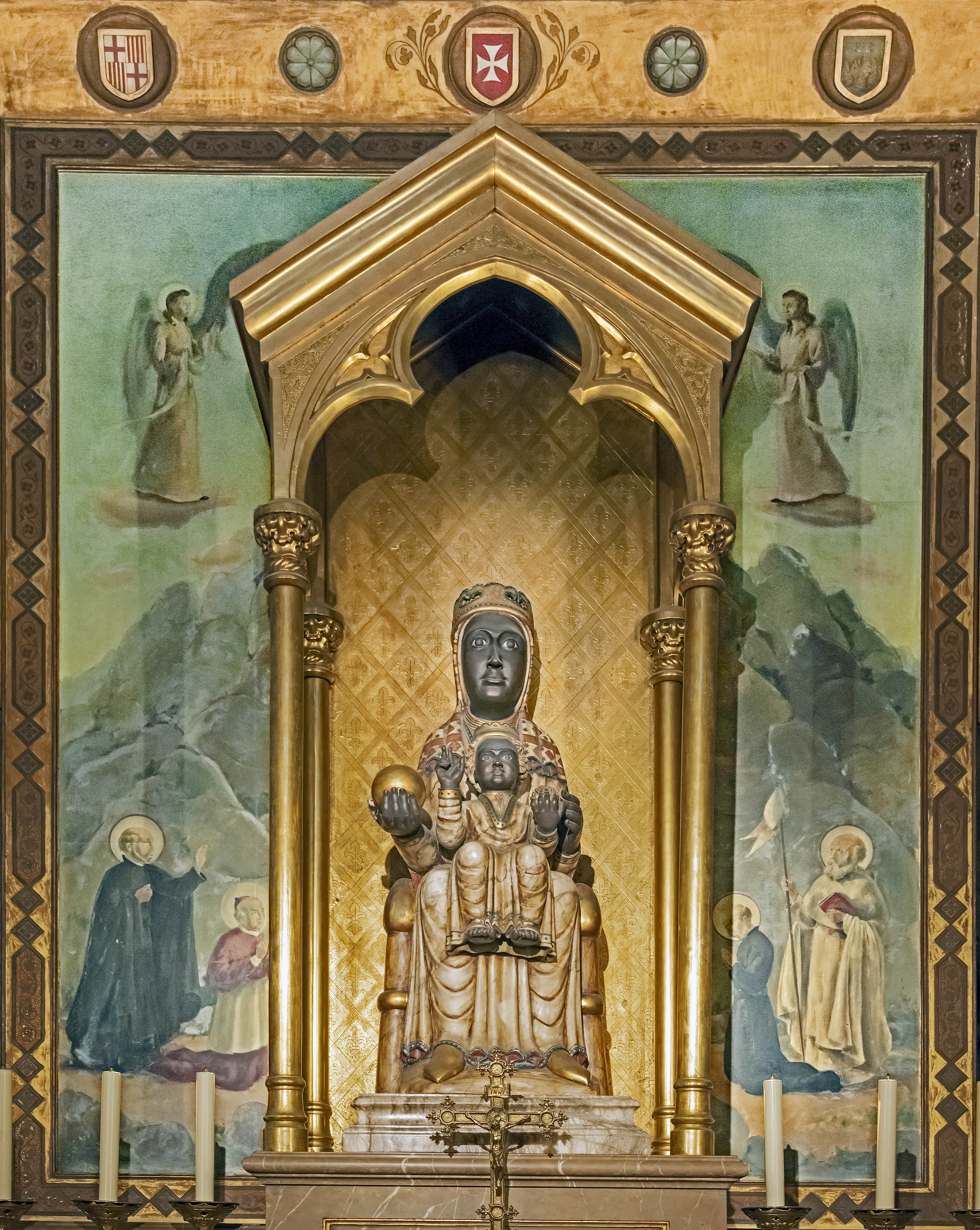
Black Madonna, Barcelona

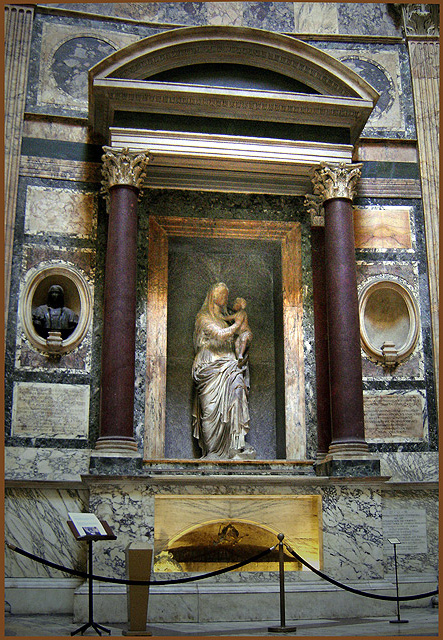
Madonna on the tomb of Raphael, Pantheon, Rome

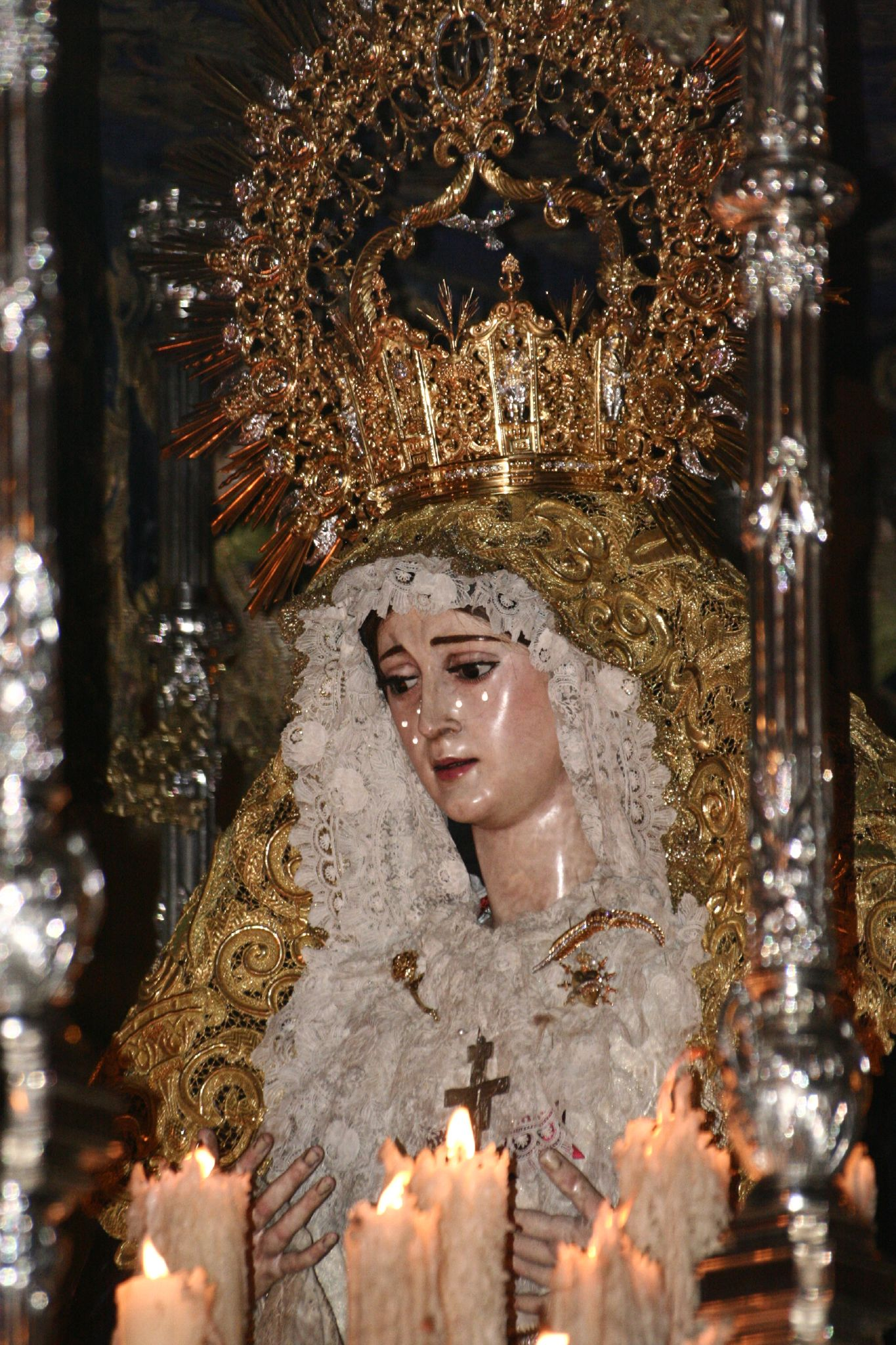
Madonna from Holy Week procession in Seville

Statue outside Moscow's New Tretyakov Gallery

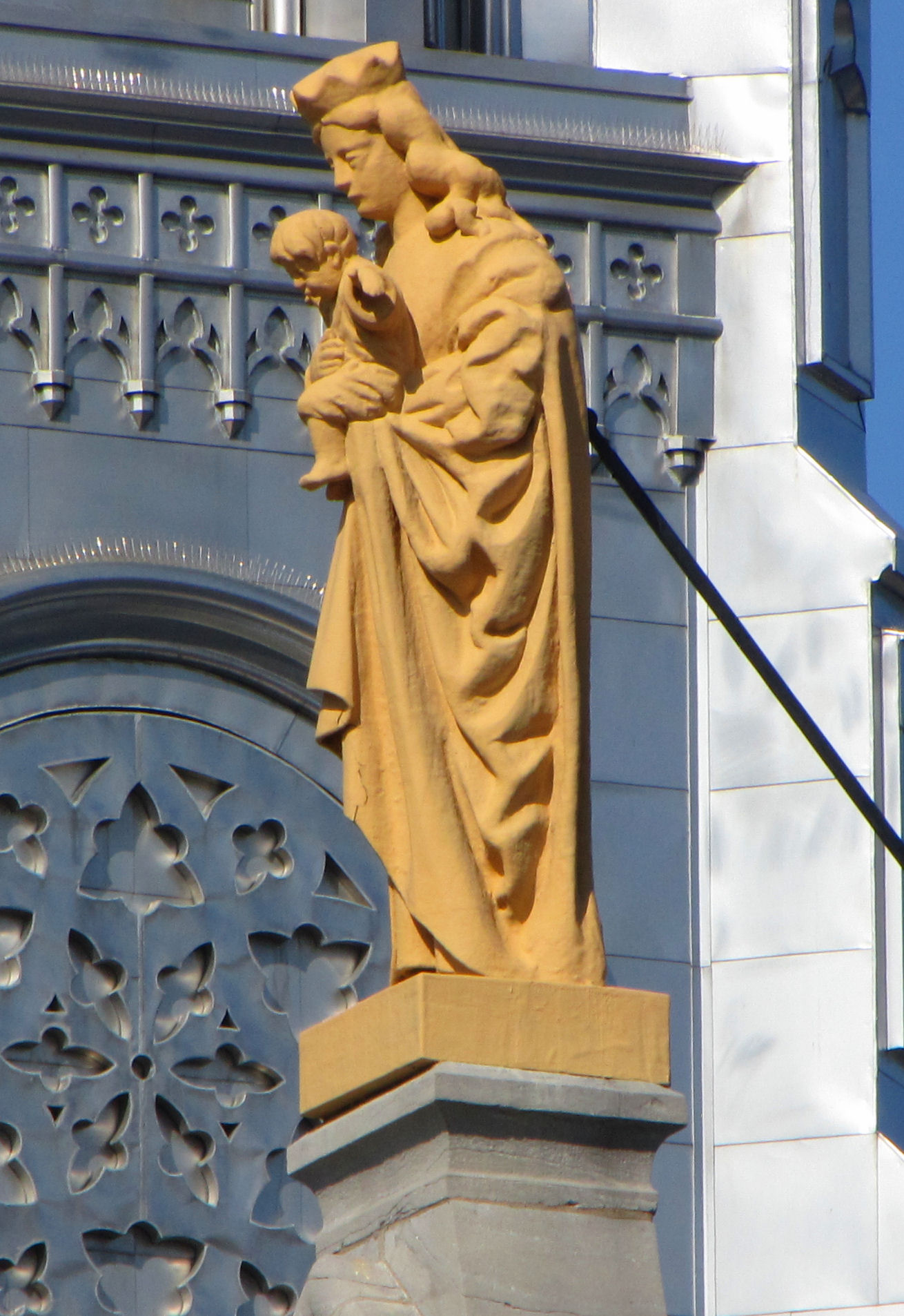
Statue Notre-Dame Cathedral Basilica, Ottawa, Ontario, Canada

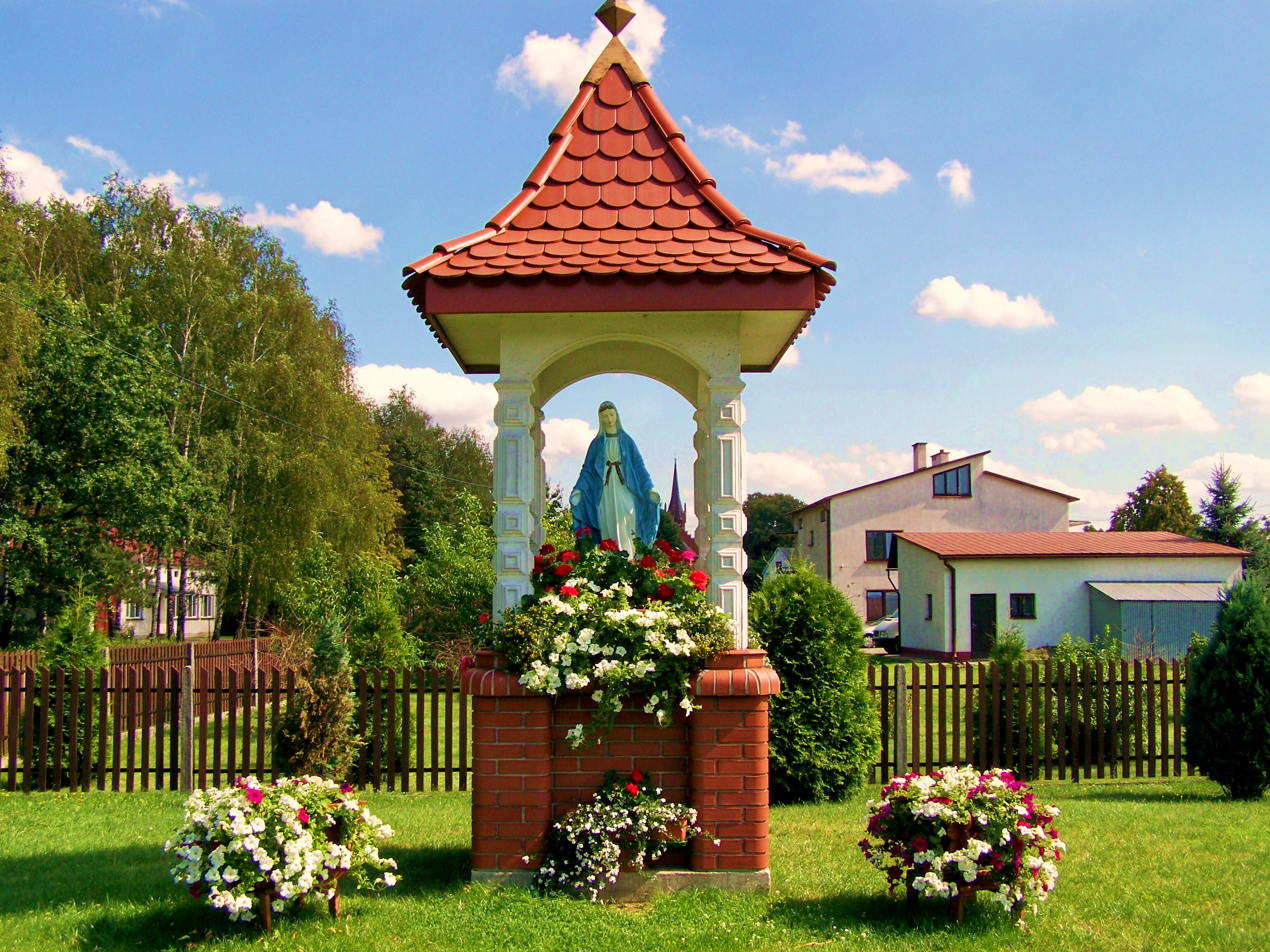
A roadside Madonna in Ocieka, Poland

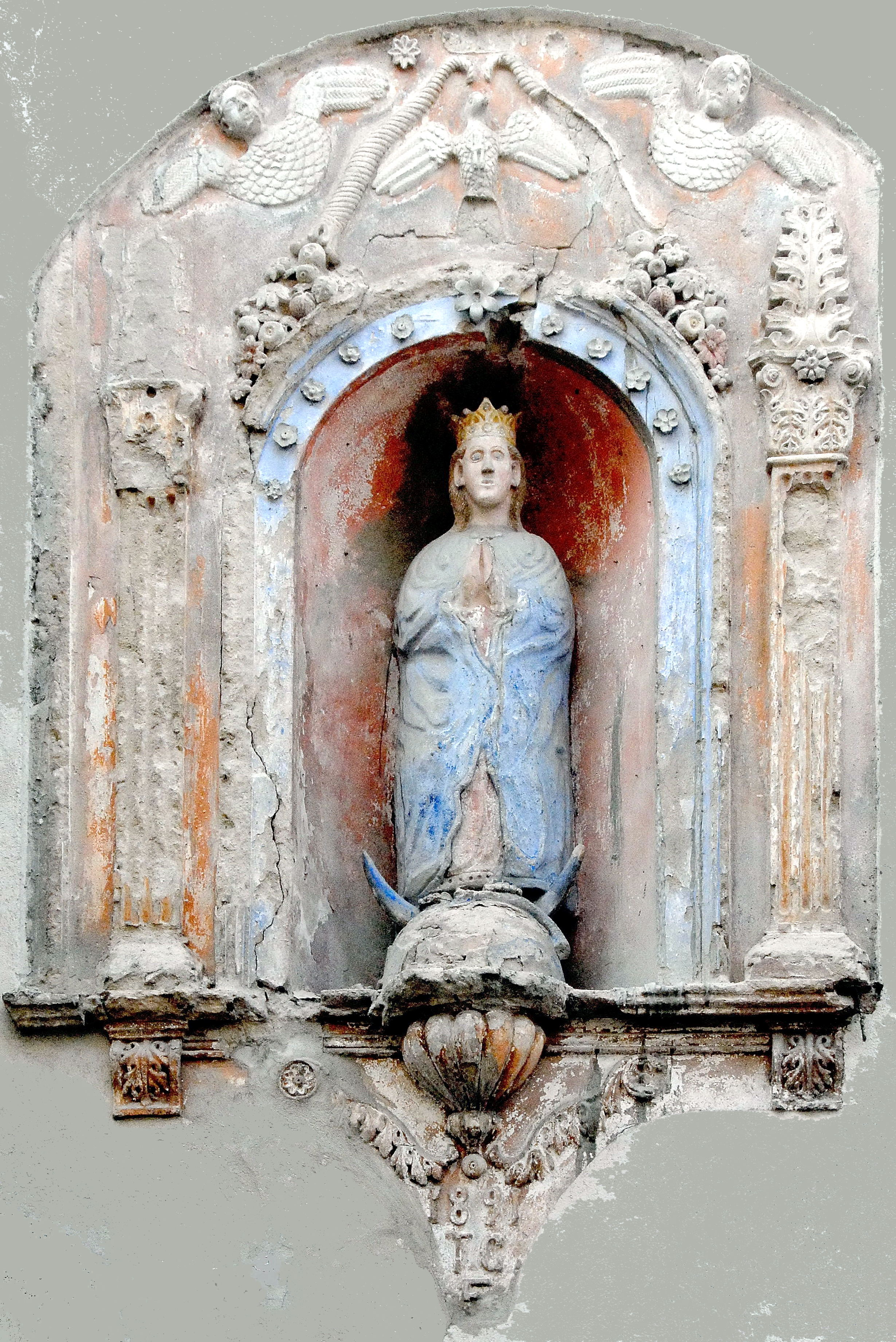
A roadside Madonna alcove in Friuli, Italy

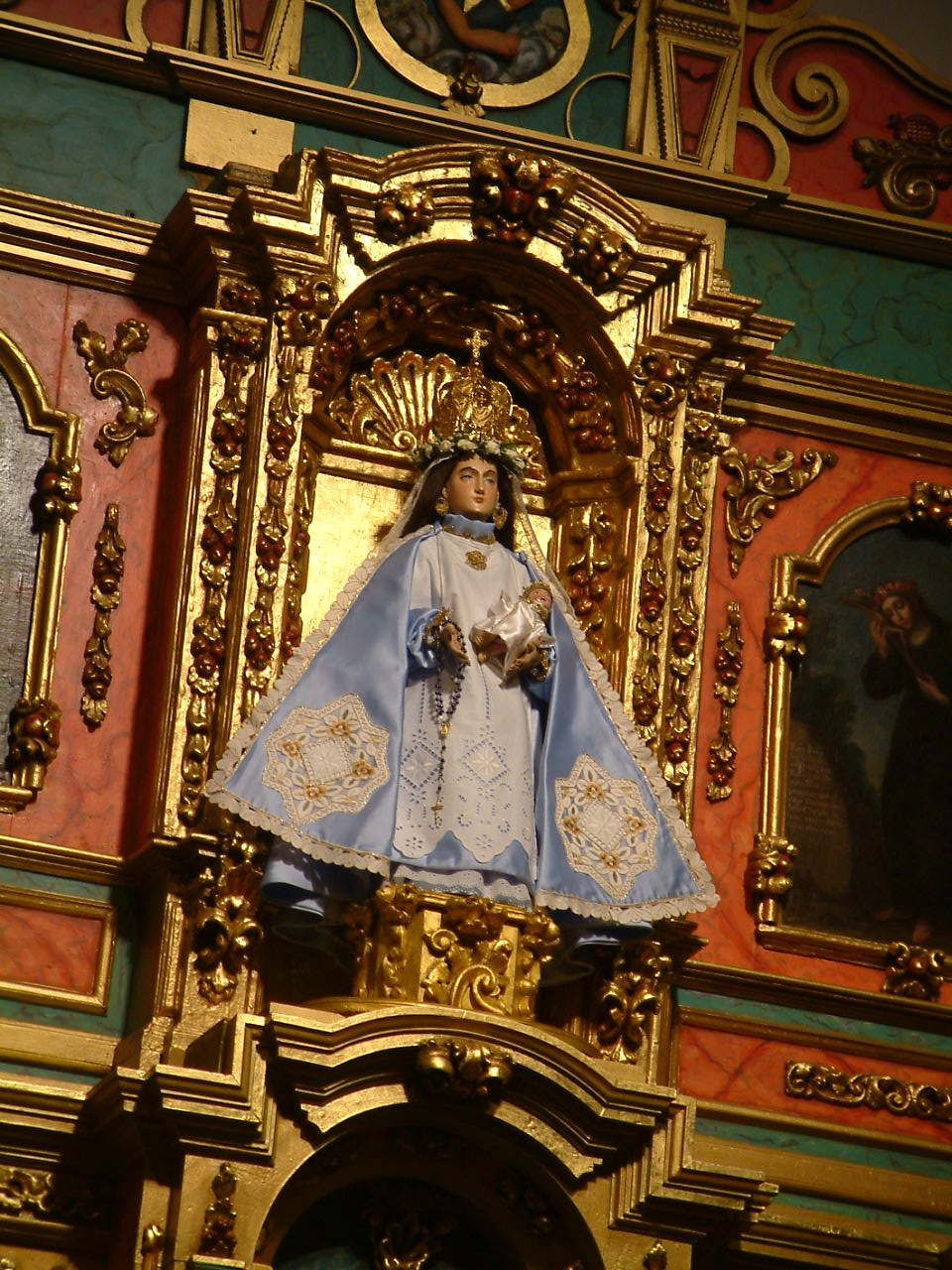
La Conquistadora, Santa Fe, New Mexico, pre-1625

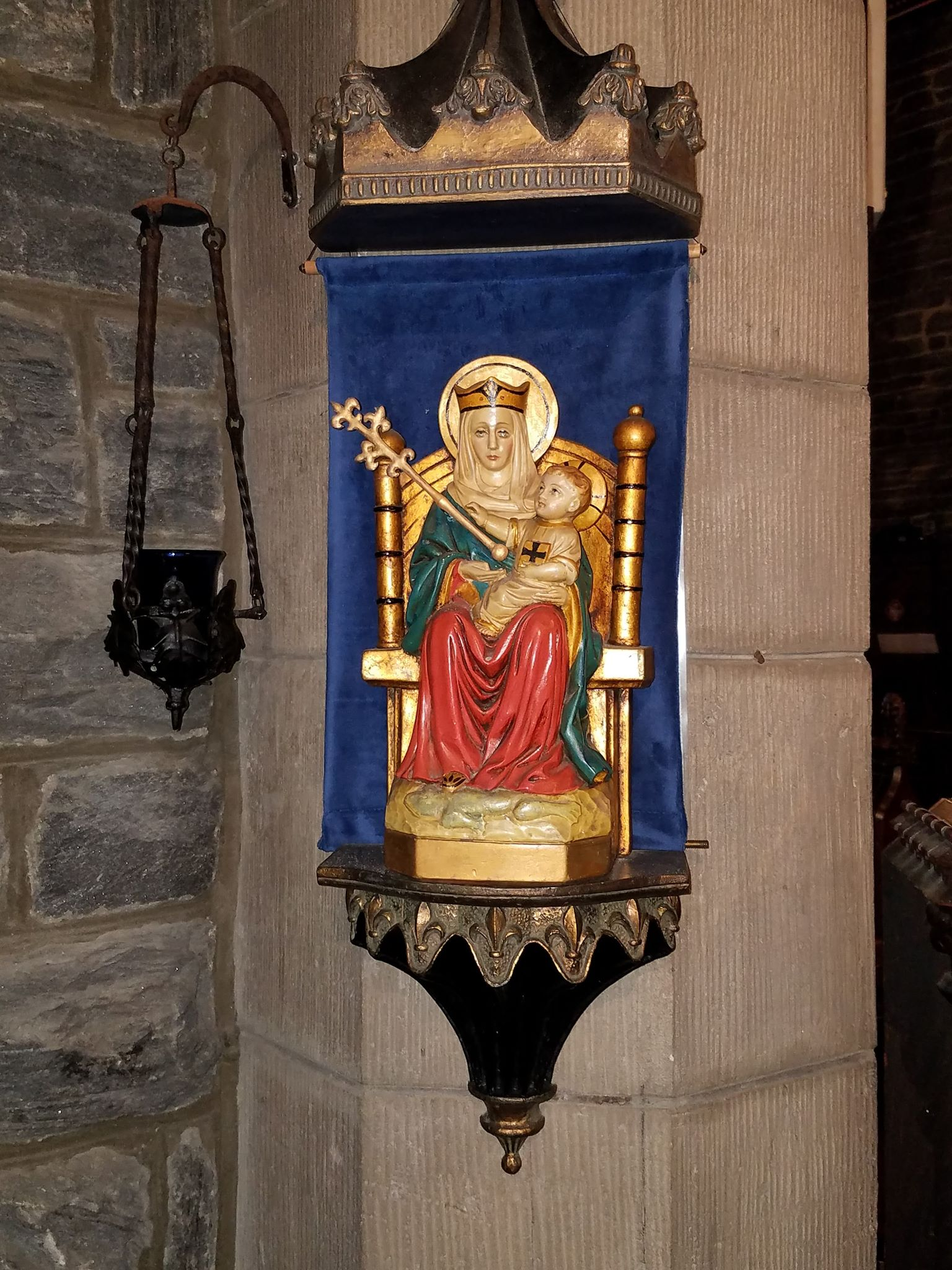
Our Lady of Walsingham shrine at Church of the Good Shepherd (Rosemont, Pennsylvania)

=== Manuscripts and covers ===
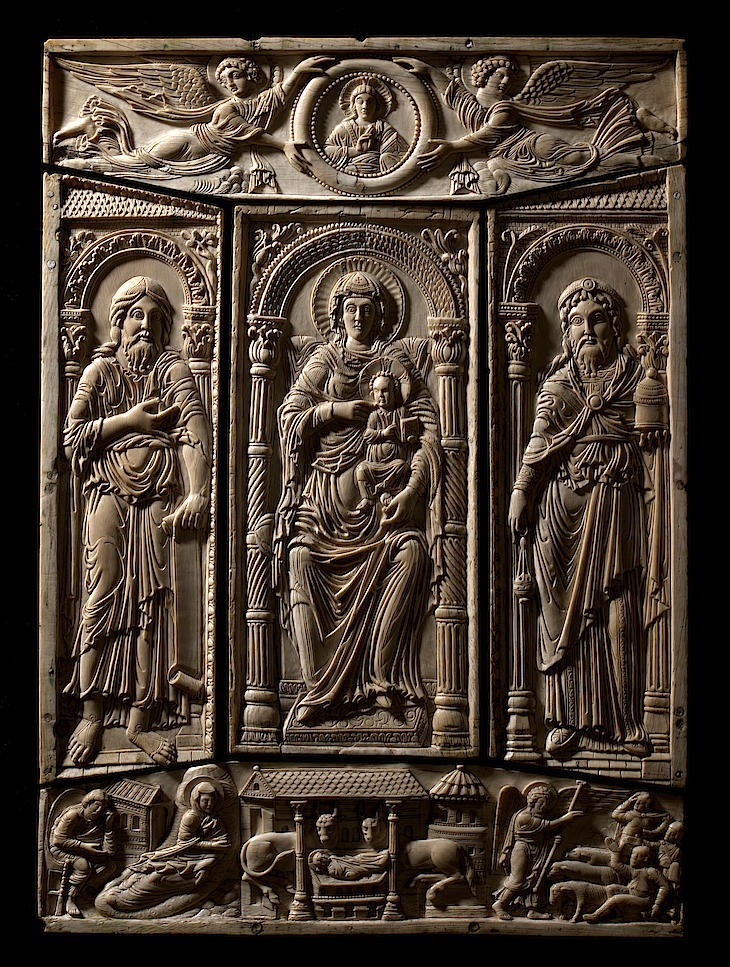
An ivory cover of the Codex Aureus of Lorsch, Germany, c. 800

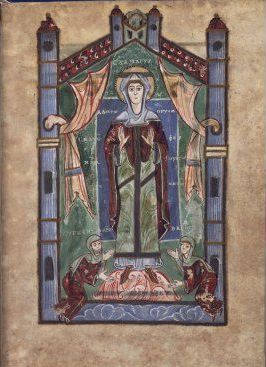
Svanhild Evangeliary, an Illuminated manuscript from Essen, 1058–1085

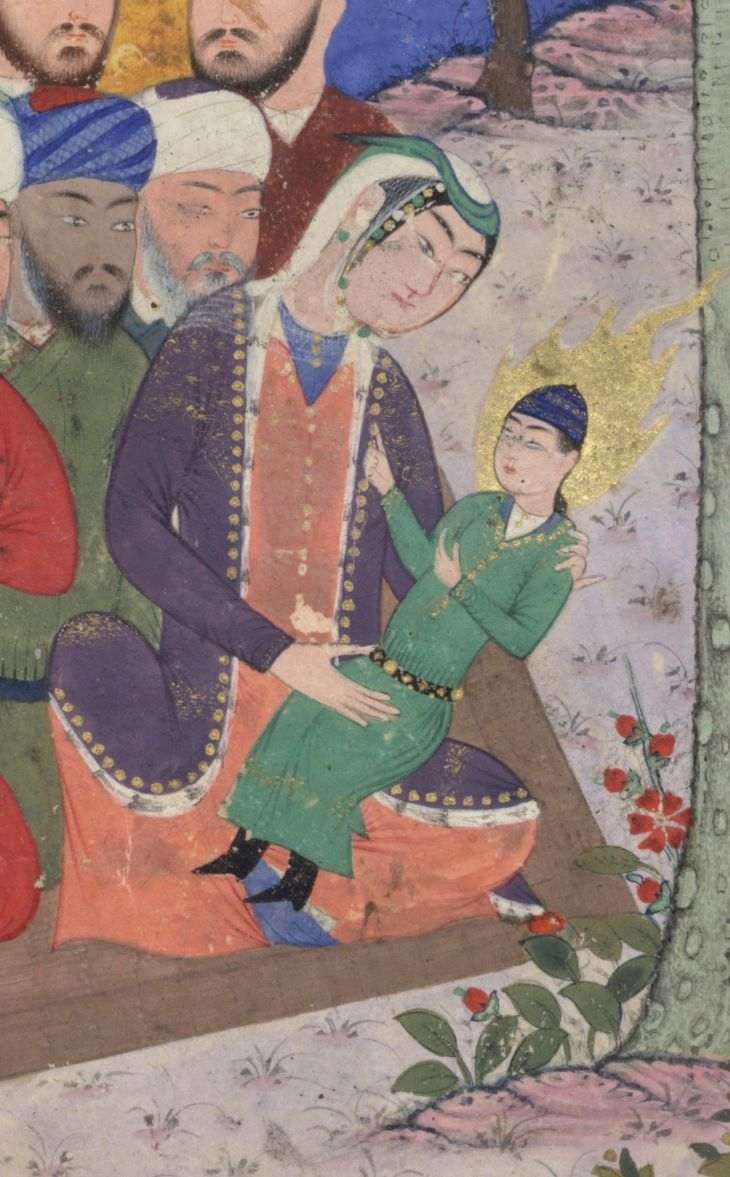
The Madonna and child in Musa va 'Uj, a manuscript painting from Iran or Iraq, 1460s

== See also ==
- Christian art
- Art in Roman Catholicism
- Mary (mother of Jesus)
- Roman Catholic Marian art
- Pietà
- Nursing Madonna
- Life-giving Spring
- Eleusa icon
- Theotokos
- Icon of the Hodegetria
- Our Lady of Guadalupe
- La Conquistadora
- Nativity of Jesus in art
