= Virgin and Child with an Angel (Botticelli, Florence) =

Painting by Sandro Botticelli

Madonna and Child with an Angel
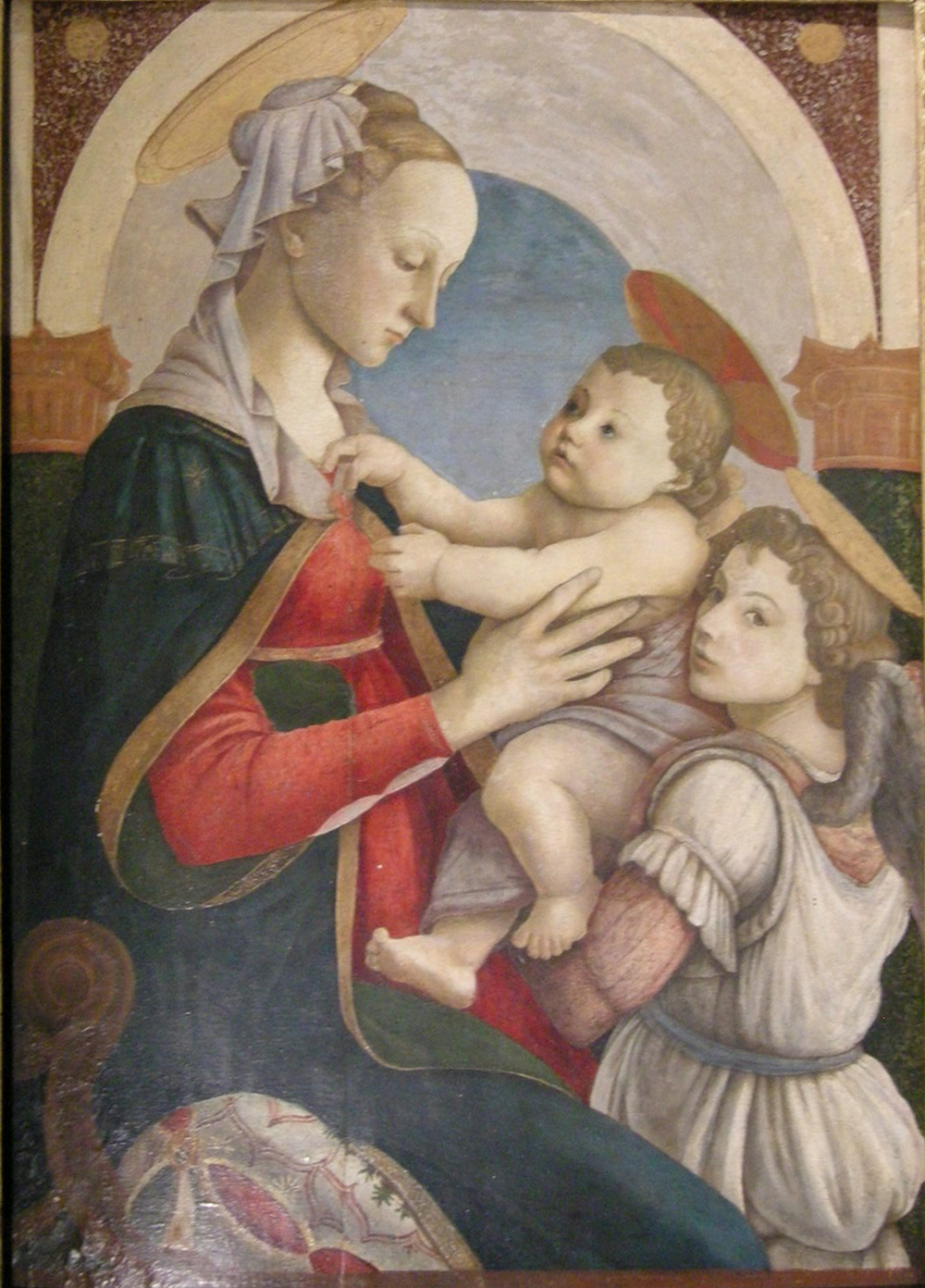
- Artist: Sandro Botticelli
- Year: 1465–1467
- Medium: Tempera on panel
- Dimensions: 87 cm × 60 cm (34 in × 24 in)
- Location: Spedale degli Innocenti, Florence

The Madonna and Child with an Angel is a painting executed c. 1465–1467 by the Italian Renaissance painter Sandro Botticelli. It is housed in Spedale degli Innocenti of Florence.

A majority of Botticelli's works date to the 1480s. This painting, one of Botticelli's earliest, reveals Botticelli's close artistic relationship with his teacher, Filippo Lippi, and is modelled on the latter's The Virgin and Child with Two Angels. With the realistic depiction of his live infant models, Botticelli's Madonna may be the earliest known depiction of the neurological Babinski reflex. Botticelli is also known for his contributions to the Sistine Chapel.

== Description ==
This depiction of Madonna and Child poses both Mary and the Infant Jesus in the center of the image, framing the gaze between Mary and her son with a blue background. The position of Mary and Child is also framed by a church-like arch supported by Composite order pillars. The Madonna is in dressed in red covered by a black cloak which has gold accents and trim. The Child wears only a white cloth. The babe is being handed to its mother by an angel, in the figure of a young boy, wearing white and red, whose wings are barely in scene. As the Mother and Child gaze at each other, the angel gazes directly toward the observer. All three figures are drawn with a halo; the Christ-Child's is a cruciform halo, which is a traditional way of distinguishing Jesus.

Botticelli showcases a non-historic image of the Madonna and Child, instead drawing his inspiration from the Renaissance ideals of beauty. There are parallels in Botticelli's work in which he continuously depicts Mary and Jesus with blonde, wavy hair and fair skin so as to elevate the image of both figures in creating a sort of devotional perfection. Other examples of this include, Madonna and Child, Madonna of the Magnificat, and Sant'Ambrogio Altarpiece (Botticelli).

== See also ==
- List of works by Sandro Botticelli
