= Madonna in Glory with Seraphim (Botticelli) =

Painting by Sandro Botticelli

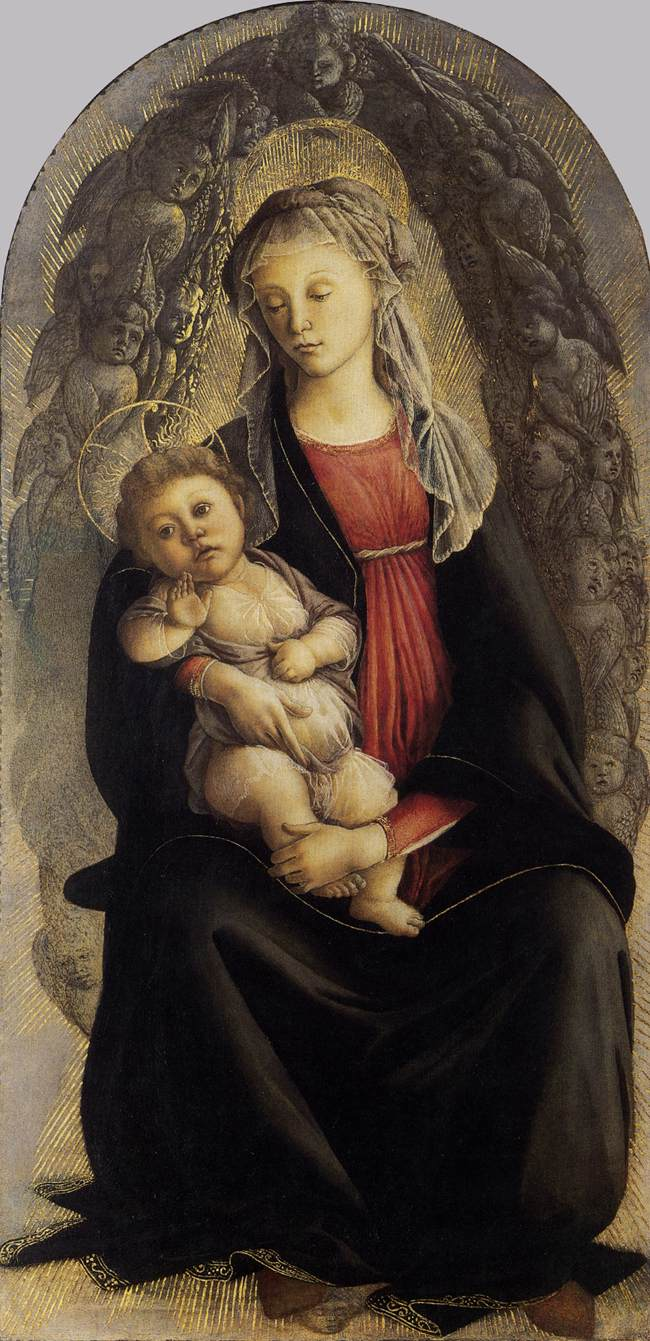
- Artist: Sandro Botticelli
- Year: 1469–1470
- Medium: Tempera on panel
- Dimensions: 120 cm × 65 cm (47 in × 26 in)
- Location: Galleria degli Uffizi, Florence

Madonna in Glory with Seraphim is a tempera painting on panel by the Italian Renaissance painter Sandro Botticelli, executed c. 1469–1470. It is housed in Galleria degli Uffizi.

== History ==
The original location of the painting is not known, but it was registered in the Uffizi inventories of 1784 and 1825 as an anonymous artwork.

The art historian Wilhelm von Bode first attributed it to Botticelli and dated it to the Verrocchio phase of his early career, c. 1469–1470 and just before his Fortitude. Later studies confirmed von Bode's hypothesis, with the exception of Adolfo Venturi who believed it to come from the school of Filippo Lippi.

== Description and style ==
The Virgin Mary holds the baby Jesus on her knees. She is enthroned on clouds and surrounded by seraphim and rays of light. The Christ Child, with the cruciform nimbus, is looking towards the observer and raising his hand in blessing. Botticelli has succeeded in expressing the tensions in this theme with sensitivity: the mother, who is fully aware of the Passion her son will suffer, is holding him protectively in her arms.

The painting displays an incisive, graphic chiaroscuro that reflects the influence of Verrocchio on Botticelli, who helped in Verrocchio's workshop as a young artist. The depiction of Christ, however, is more plainly Botticelli's own style—he is depicted with rounded shapes and the melancholic air that often appears in Botticelli's work. The figure of Mary is elongated and loose, similar to the works of Filippo Lippi, another influence of Botticelli's. Similarly, Marie's delicately rounded face depicted with contour lines also recalls Lippi's work.

Similar panel paintings of the Madonna by Botticelli remain from around 1470. Two full figure pictures of the Madonna —the Madonna in Glory and the Madonna of the Rose Garden—are in the Uffizi. Like Madonna in Glory with Seraphim , they represent monumental seated figures that fill the entire picture.

== See also ==
- List of works by Sandro Botticelli

== Bibliography ==
- Santi, Bruno (2001). I protagonisti dell'arte italiana : Piero della Francesca, Botticelli, Leonardo, Michelangelo, Raffaello, Tiziano, Caravaggio, Canaletto e i Vedutisti (in Italian). Antella (Firenze): Scala. ISBN 88-8117-091-4.
