= Man of Sorrows (disambiguation) =

Man of Sorrows may refer to:

- Man of Sorrows, a devotional image of Jesus in the passion, often shown wearing a crown of thorns
  - The Man of Sorrows from the New Town Hall in Prague, 1410s
  - Man of Sorrows (Geertgen tot Sint Jans), c. 1485–1495
  - The Man of Sorrows (Botticelli), c. 1500–1510
  - Man of Sorrows (Heemskerck), 1532
  - The Man of Sorrows (Ensor), 1891
- "Man of Sorrows" (Bruce Dickinson song), 1997
- Man of Sorrows (musical), a 1972 Australian musical with music by Enzo Toppano and lyrics by Peggy Mortimer and Lorrae Desmond
- Man of Sorrows, a 2013 song by Hillsong Worship

== See also ==
- Man of Constant Sorrow, American folk song
- Man of Constant Sorrow (With a Garage in Constant Use), song by rock band Half Man Half Biscuit
