= Bardi Madonna =

Painting by Sandro Botticelli

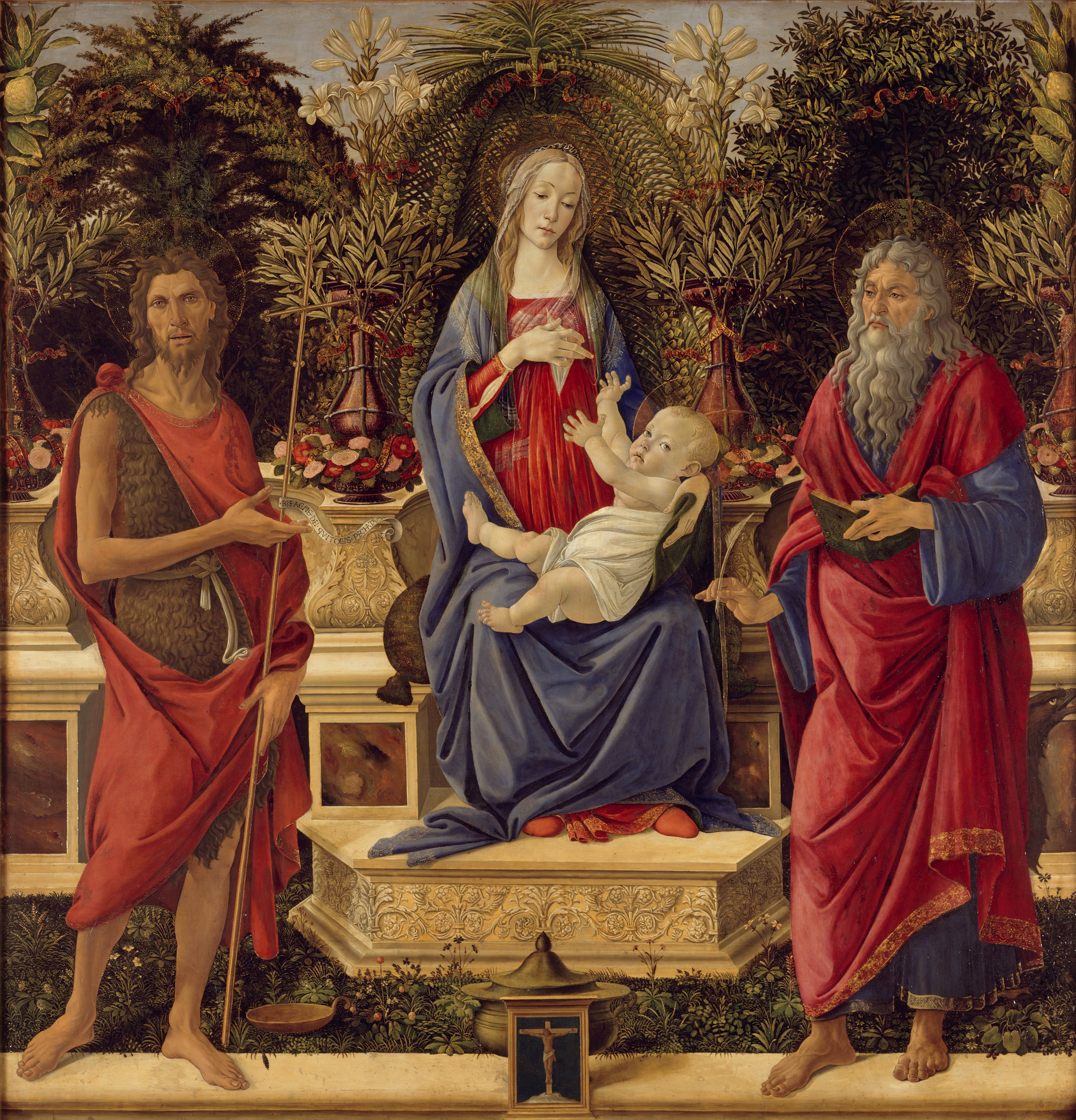
- Artist: Sandro Botticelli
- Year: c. 1484–1485
- Medium: Tempera on panel
- Dimensions: 185 cm × 180 cm (73 in × 71 in)
- Location: Gemäldegalerie, Berlin

The Bardi Madonna or Madonna and Child with Saint John the Baptist and Saint John the Evangelist is a 1480s tempera-on-panel painting by the Italian Renaissance artist Sandro Botticelli, now in the Gemäldegalerie, Berlin. Its primary name derives from the rich Florentine banker Agnolo Bardi, who commissioned it for his family chapel at the Santo Spirito Basilica in Florence. It was completed around the end of 1485.

It includes several symbols of Mary's virginity (the hortus conclusus in the background), purity (white lilies), her sinless state (the white flowers in the "mystic vase" at the foot of her throne) and her status as a new Venus (myrtle). The red flowers in the vase also allude to Christ’s Passion and to the two Johns' martyrdoms, whilst the olive and laurel branches refer to the mystery of the Incarnation. The ascetic character of the figure of Mary shows Savonarola's influence on the artist.

== See also ==
- List of works by Sandro Botticelli
