= Portrait of a Young Man (Botticelli, London) =

Painting by Sandro Botticelli

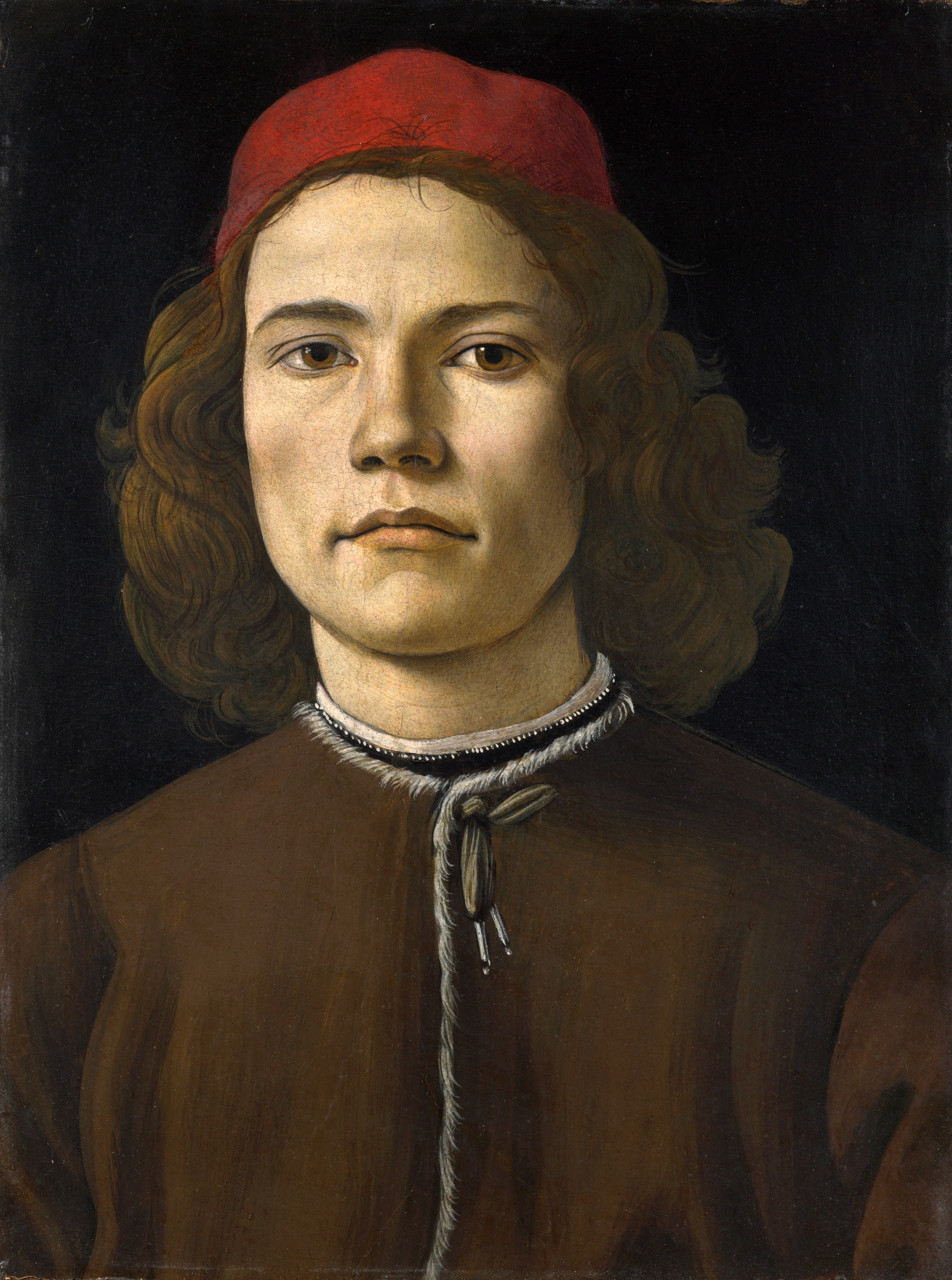
- Artist: Sandro Botticelli
- Year: c. 1483
- Medium: Tempera on panel
- Dimensions: 37.5 cm × 28.3 cm (14.8 in × 11.1 in)
- Location: National Gallery, London

Portrait of a Young Man (Ritratto virile) is a tempera on panel painting by the Italian Renaissance artist Sandro Botticelli, c. 1483, housed in the National Gallery in London.

This panel painting is small but significant. Before this work, subjects in Italian portraiture were either seated portrait view in profile, or seated with three-quarters of their face showing. In this painting the boy is seated head on, so his whole face can be mapped out, making this a revolutionary work for its time.

This work has at various times been attributed to Giorgione, Filippino Lippi and even believed to be a self-portrait by Masaccio. It is now widely accepted as a Botticelli and is his only known en face portrait. The man in the painting is a young city dweller from Florence; his name is unknown.

== See also ==
- List of works by Sandro Botticelli
- Botticelli's portraits in Palazzo Pitti and National Gallery of Art, Washington, D.C.
