= Portrait of a Young Man (Botticelli, Pitti Palace) =

Painting by Sandro Botticelli

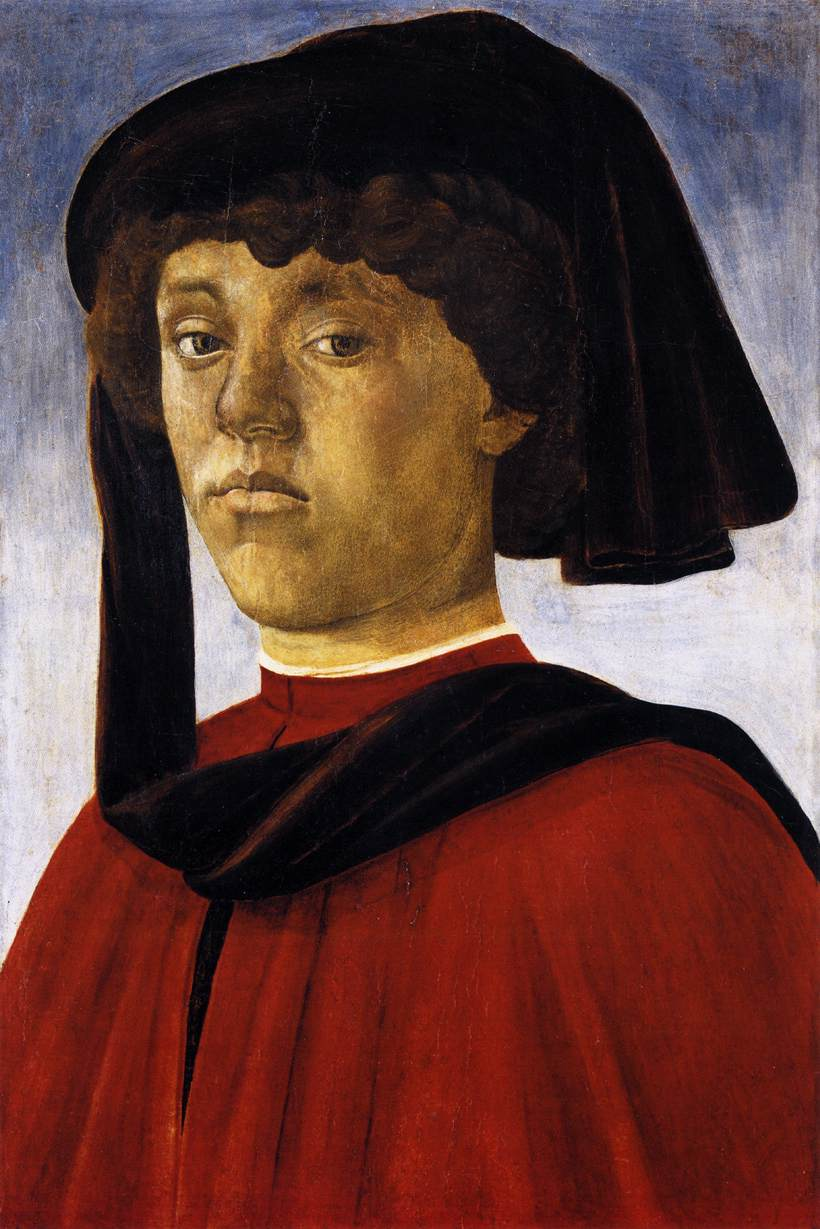
- Artist: Sandro Botticelli
- Year: c. 1470–1475
- Medium: Tempera on panel
- Dimensions: 51 cm × 33.7 cm (20 in × 13.3 in)
- Location: Palazzo Pitti, Florence

The Portrait of a Young Man is a painting by the Italian Renaissance artist Sandro Botticelli, dated between 1470 and 1475. It is housed in the Palazzo Pitti of Florence.

Variously attributed to different painters, it was eventually included in Botticelli's works. It is one of the first known three-quarters portraits in western European art.

The painting is much darker than Botticelli's other works, even after it was cleaned in 1935.

== See also ==
- List of works by Sandro Botticelli
- Botticelli's portraits at National Gallery, London, and National Gallery of Art, Washington, D.C.
