= Madonna Adoring the Child with Five Angels (Botticelli) =

Painting by Sandro Botticelli

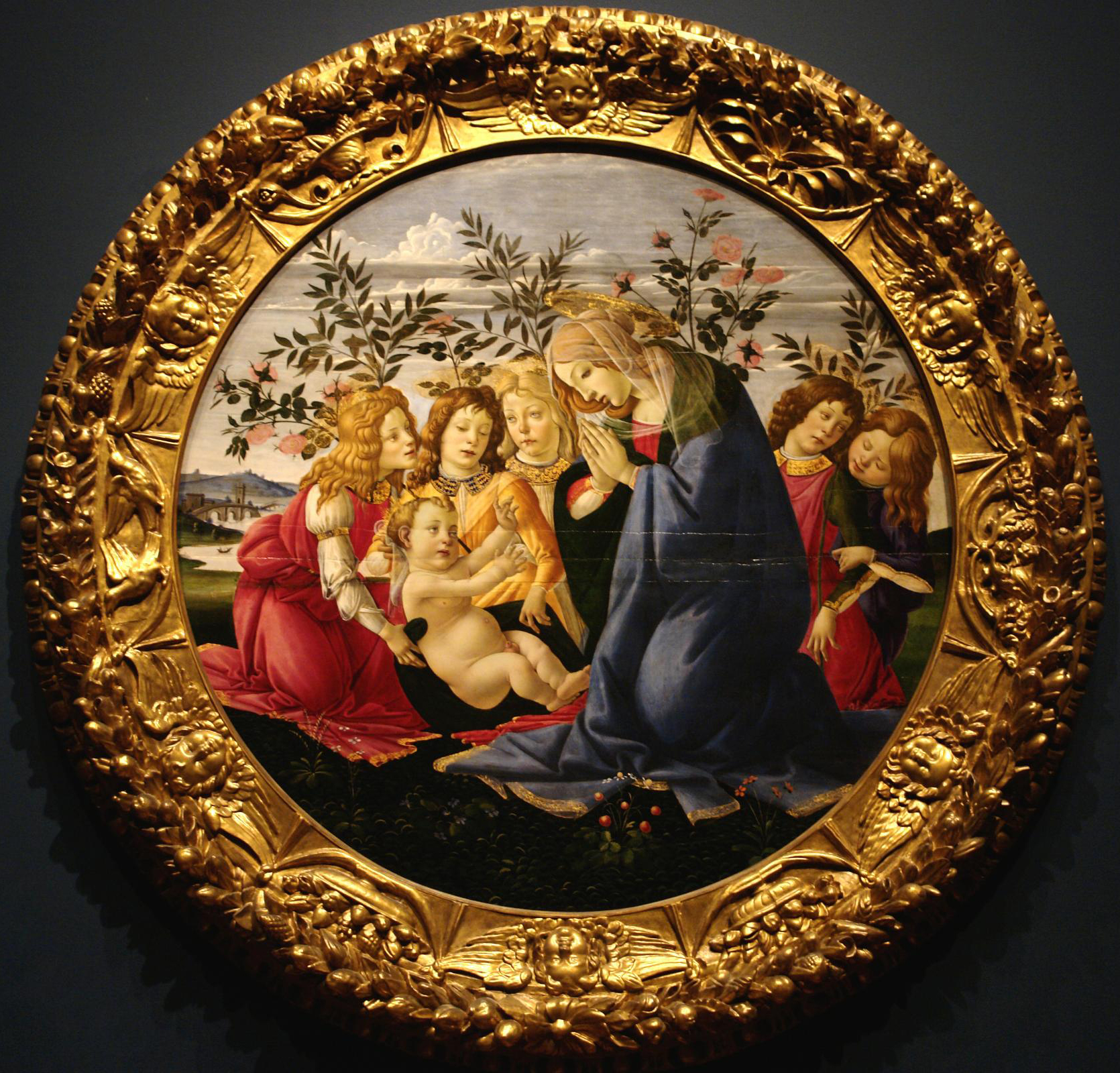
- Artist: Sandro Botticelli
- Year: 1485—1490
- Medium: Tempera on panel
- Location: Baltimore Museum of Art, Baltimore

Madonna Adoring the Child with Five Angels is a tondo or round painting by the Italian Renaissance master Sandro Botticelli, completed between 1485 and 1490. It is housed in the Baltimore Museum of Art, in Baltimore, Maryland. The medium is tempera and oil on a round wood panel. It is part of the Mary Frick Jacobs Collection.

This work illustrates the Madonna with a young Jesus accompanied by five angels.

== See also ==
- List of works by Sandro Botticelli

== Bibliography ==
- Deimling, Barbara (2007). Sandro Botticelli, 1444/45–1510. Hong Kong: Taschen. ISBN 978-3-8228-5992-6.
