= Madonna of the Magnificat =

Painting by Sandro Botticelli

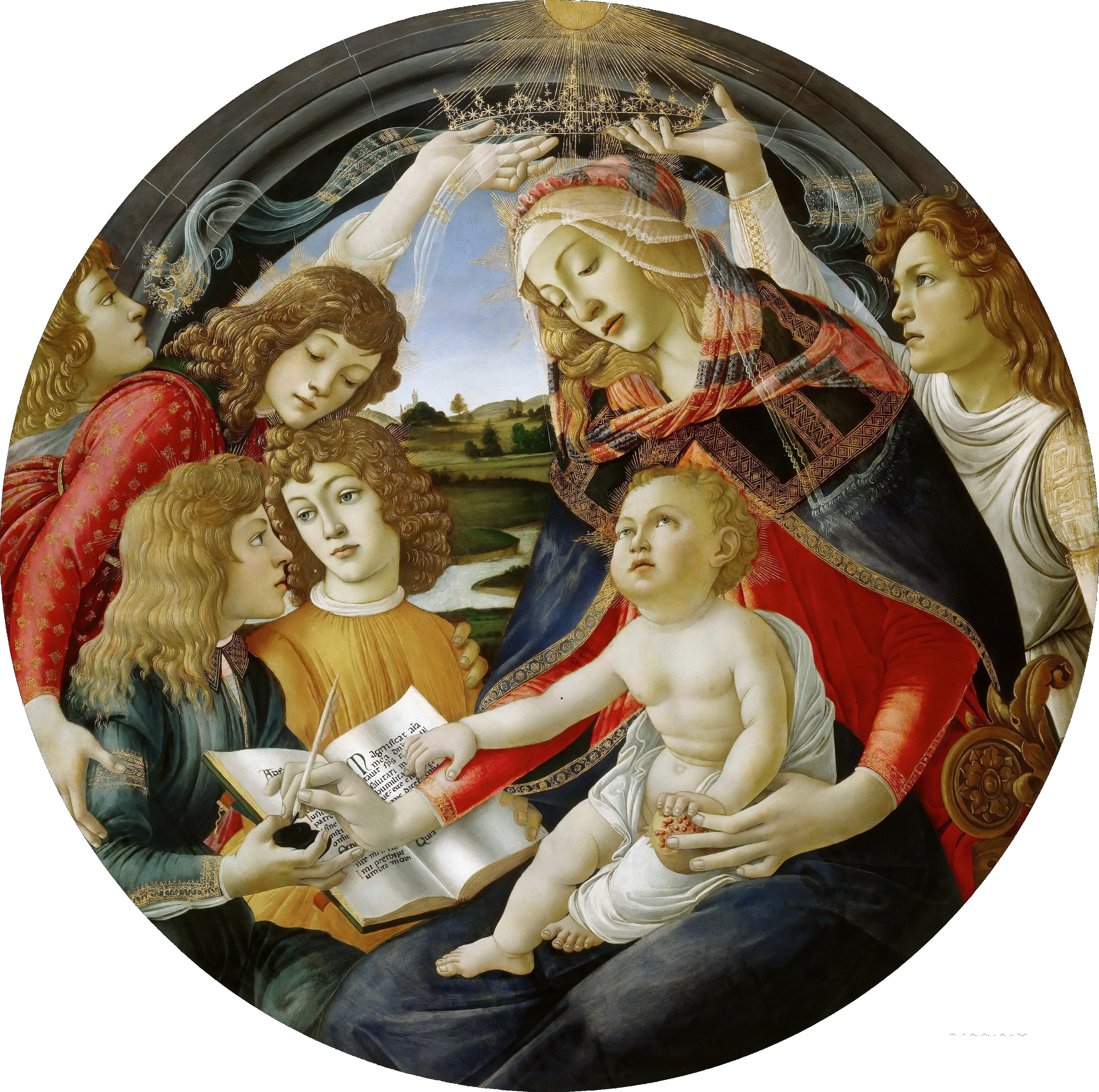
- Artist: Sandro Botticelli
- Year: 1481
- Medium: Tempera
- Dimensions: 118 cm × 119 cm (46 in × 47 in)
- Location: Uffizi, Florence

The Madonna of the Magnificat (Italian: Madonna del Magnificat), is a painting of circular or tondo form by the Italian Renaissance painter Sandro Botticelli. It is also referred to as the Virgin and Child with Five Angels. In the tondo, we see the Virgin Mary writing the Magnificat with her right hand, with a pomegranate in her left, as two angels crown her with the Christ child on her lap. It is now in the galleries of the Uffizi, in Florence.

== History ==
The history of the painting is not known, but the Uffizi acquired it from a private collection in 1784. It may have come from one of the many monasteries suppressed by the Archduke Pietro Leopoldo. There are several copies of the painting, including one in the Louvre and one in the Morgan Library & Museum in New York. In the Louvre's copy, the leftmost angel, crowning the Virgin, is erased, leaving room for a large spread of wings for the highest angel in the trio to the left.

== Description ==
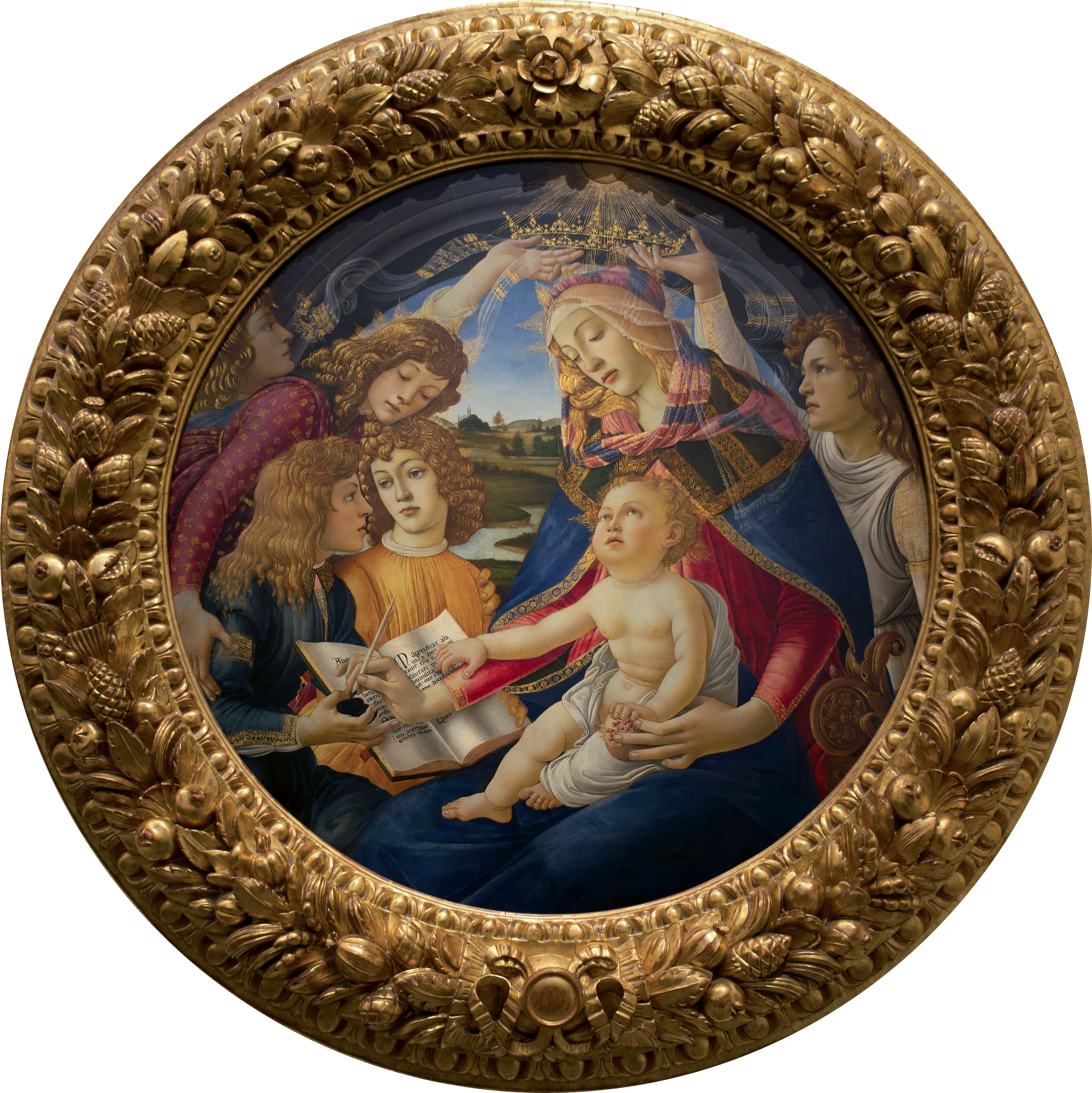
The tondo in its frame

The work portrays the Virgin Mary crowned by two of five angels, a sheer veil covering her flowing blonde hair and a Byzantine style scarf around her shoulders. She is writing the opening of the Magnificat on the right-hand page of a book; on the left page is part of the Benedictus. As Mary writes in the Magnificat, the infant Jesus guides her hand, looking up to the clear blue sky, or perhaps to his mother, softly returning his gaze. In her left hand she holds a pomegranate. The figures are placed in front of a bright and serene landscape, and the framing creates a division between Heaven and earth. To the left, three angels crowd around the Magnificat, seemingly in deep conversation amongst one another.

The Magnificat, a canticle also known as The Song of Mary, is taken from the Gospel of Luke (1:46–55). In this narrative, Mary is visiting her cousin, Elizabeth, who is pregnant with John the Baptist. As John moves within Elizabeth's womb, Mary praises God for the favor he has bestowed upon her. The Benedictus, also known as The Song of Zechariah, is another canticle taken from the Gospel of Luke (1:68–79), and was the song uttered by Zechariah during the circumcision of his son, John the Baptist.

Many art historians have debated that Mary is thought to be a portrait of Lucrezia Tornabuoni, wife of Piero de' Medici, and the two angels holding the book to be her sons Lorenzo and Giuliano.In Giorgio Vasari's The Lives of the Most Excellent Painters, Sculptors, and Artists, Vasari states:

In the Guardaroba of the Signor Duke Cosimo are two very beautiful female heads in profile by this master, one is said to be the portrait of an inamorata of Giuliano de' Medici, brother of Lorenzo; the other that of Madonna Lucrezia Tornabuoni, Lorenzo's mother.

However, there are no reliable sources that definitively recognize this portrait as the Madonna of the Magnificat, so this hypothesis is largely disregarded. The identity of the Madonna is unknown, and may simply be one of the many generic Madonna figures that Botticelli painted throughout his career.

== Madonna as a female writer ==
Conventionally, the Madonna is depicted as a reader rather than a writer. In this painting, Botticelli made the decision to depict her as a writer. Following common Humanist rhetoric, this shift from reading to writing raises more questions. Traditionally, the Magnificat was believed to be an oration by Mary, rather than a written document. This depiction of the Virgin as a writer, however, employs what may be a "rhetoric of impossibility." There is a concept that the literacy and ability to compose writing in women is a "miracle," as no other woman has the ability to obtain the factors that make the Virgin who she is; the virginal, noble figure that is highly revered by all who follow the Bible in a Christian setting. While at first glance, this may appear as a feminist statement about humanist female authors and scholars at the time, it can be analyzed as a backhanded compliment, disregarding the movement towards female literacy and using this "rhetoric of impossibility." Botticelli further intensifies the Virgin's position as a woman writer, juxtaposing her roles as a mother and as an author. The Madonna is simultaneously portrayed as a maternal figure, softly tending to the Christ child, and as an author, exemplifying the aforementioned "rhetoric of impossibility." Botticelli's work highlights a clash in depicting the woman writer as a phenomenon, while simultaneously embracing a growing conversation of chance. This is frequently communicated through the vernacular and is directed at female audiences, aiming to portray the woman writer as a more common figure.

== Botticelli's Madonnas ==
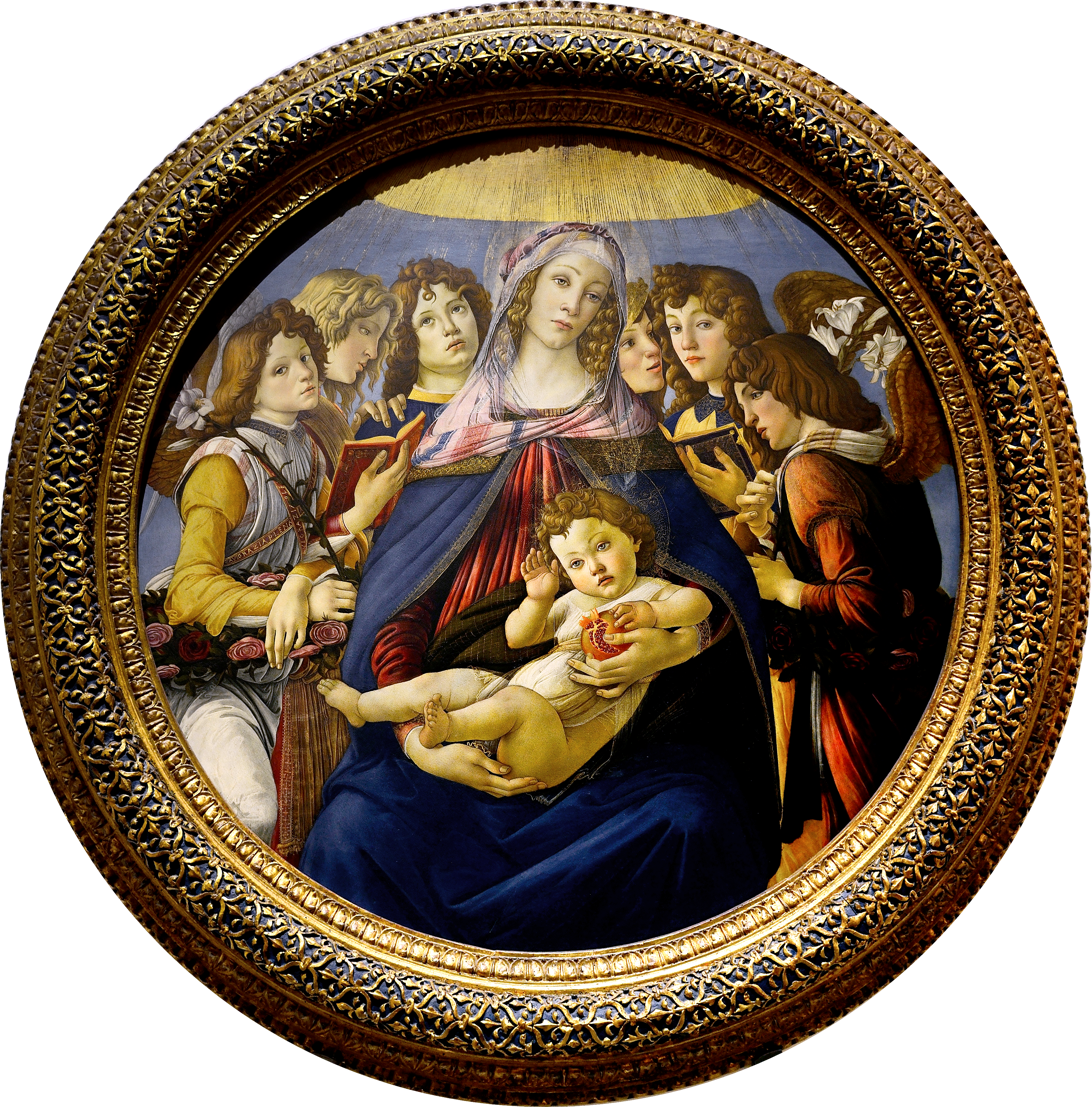
Madonna of the Pomegranate (Madonna degla Melagrana), c. 1487, tempera on panel

It is widely agreed that Botticelli went through three distinct artistic phases, marked by the subjects of his work rather than any shift in artistic style. During the first of these three phases, he maintained a very moderate, average emotional state throughout the content of his paintings, aptly regarded as the "Medici phase". During this phase, Botticelli painted several Madonnas, including another large-scale tondo, Madonna of the Pomegranate. Each of them were incredibly maternal in nature, the soft motherly love of the Virgin accentuated by the tenderness between herself and the Christ child. Botticelli famously painted his female figures, especially his Madonnas, with incredibly pale, porcelain-like faces, with light pink blushing across their noses, cheeks, and mouths. This phase in Botticelli's art was also characterized by the combination of features typically found in court paintings, as well as qualities learned from his study of Classical works. Botticelli juxtaposes the Classical grace of these quasi-courtly paintings with the garb of then-contemporary Florentines.

Much like Madonna of the Pomegranate, this Madonna is seen holding a pomegranate in her left hand. Although there are no definitive arguments regarding the pomegranate seen in the Madonna of the Magnificat, there has been discussion that the pomegranate seen in the other tondo is representative of an anatomically accurate human heart. Pomegranates have been used symbolically throughout artistic eras, beginning in pagan mythology where it symbolized Persephone and her springtime return to earth. With the introduction of Christianity, this symbolism evolved to represent immortality and resurrection. In addition, because of its many seeds, the pomegranate can also symbolize fertility. The pomegranate is often used in Renaissance art to represent the fullness of Jesus' suffering and resurrection. Some experts have noted the cardiac anatomic accuracy of the pomegranate, which may further emphasize this suffering experienced by Jesus in his corporeal form. This accuracy can also be seen in the Madonna of the Magnificat, although the placement is below Christ's heart, whereas the placement of Madonna of the Pomegranate sits right above his heart.

== See also ==
- List of works by Sandro Botticelli
