= Punishment of the Sons of Korah =

Fresco by Sandro Botticelli

Punishment of the Rebels
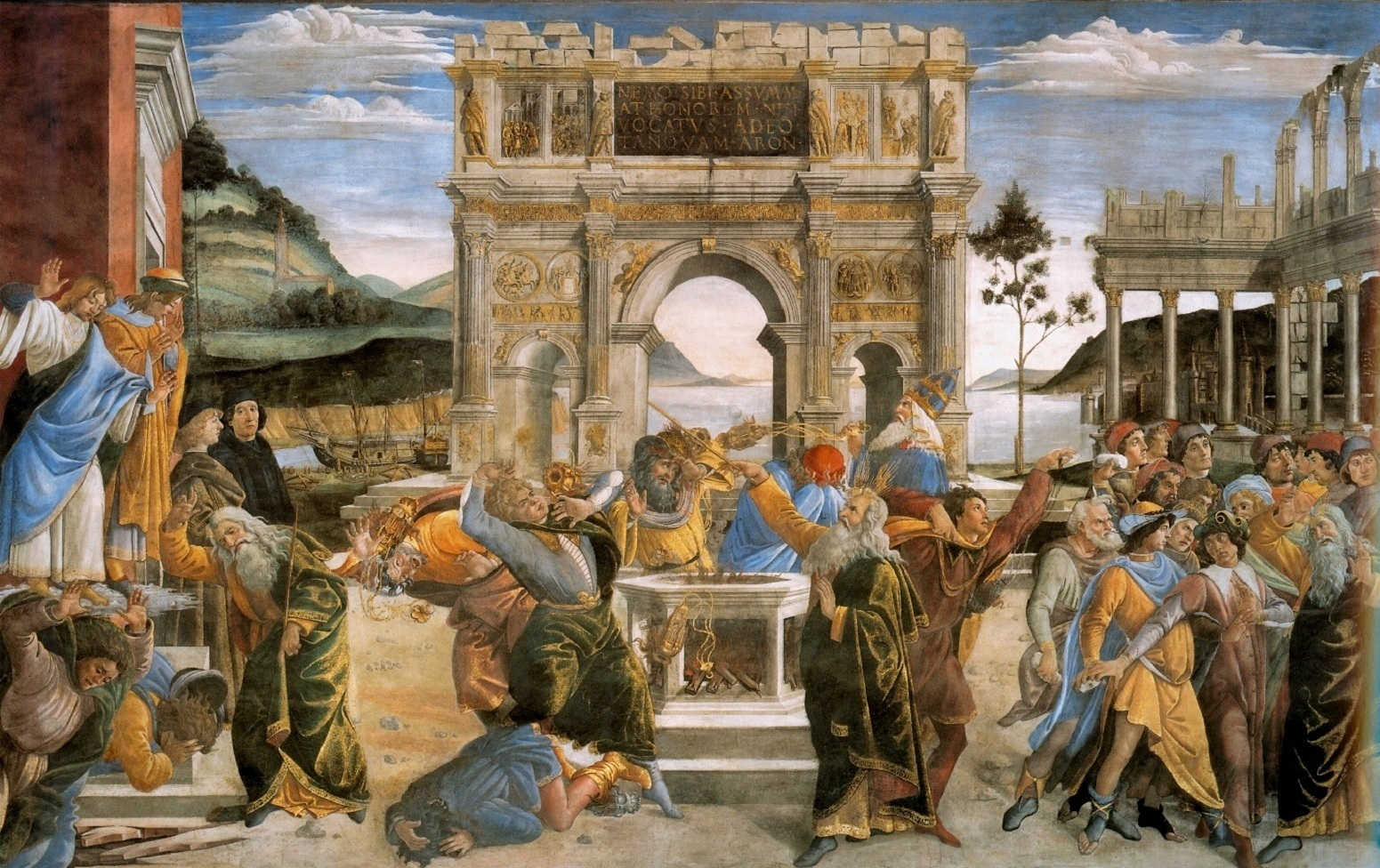
- Artist: Sandro Botticelli
- Year: 1480–1482
- Type: Fresco
- Dimensions: 348.5 cm × 570 cm (137.2 in × 220 in)
- Location: Sistine Chapel; Rome

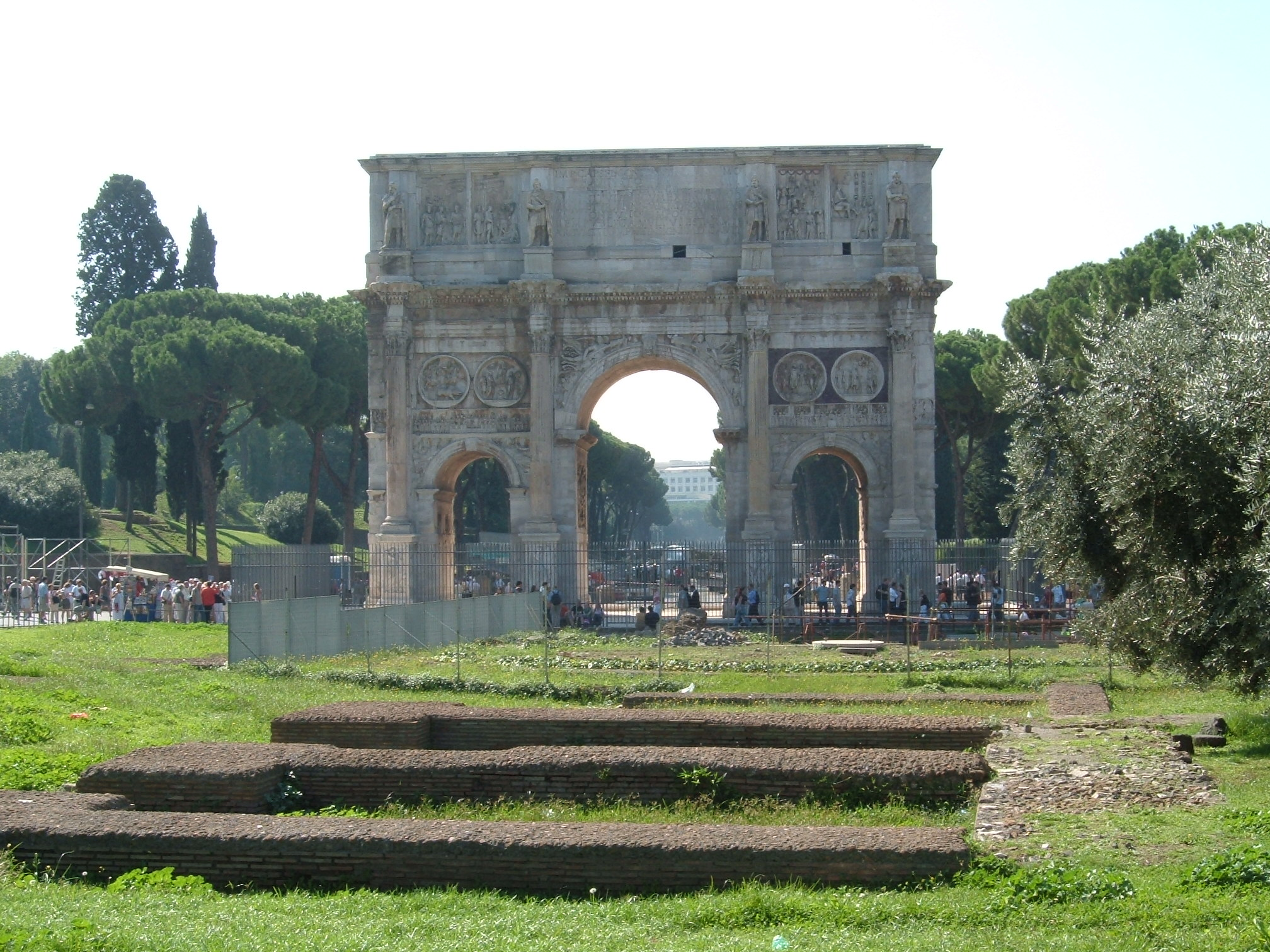
The (restored) Arch of Constantine, Campus Martius, Rome

The Punishment of the Sons of Korah or Punishment of the Rebels is a fresco by the Italian Renaissance painter Sandro Botticelli, executed in 1480–1482 in the Sistine Chapel, Rome.

== History ==
On 27 October 1480 Botticelli, together with other Florentine painters, left for Rome, where he had been called as part of the reconciliation project between Lorenzo de' Medici, the de facto ruler of Florence, and Pope Sixtus IV. The Florentines started to work in the Sistine Chapel as early as spring 1481, along with Pietro Perugino, who was already there.

The theme of the decoration was a parallel between the lives of Moses and Christ, as a sign of continuity between the Old and the New Testament. A continuity also between Mosaic Law and the message of Jesus, who in turn chose Peter (the first bishop of Rome) as his successor; the latter's successors were the popes of Rome.

Botticelli painted three scenes, helped by numerous assistants. On 17 February 1482 his contract was renewed, including the other scenes to complete the chapel's decoration. However, on the 20th of the same month, his father died: he returned to Florence, where he remained.

== Description ==
The painting depicts three episodes and tells of a rebellion by the Israelites against Moses and Aaron. On the right the rebels attempt to stone Moses after becoming disenchanted by their trials on their emigration from Egypt. Joshua has placed himself between the rebels and Moses, protecting him from the stoning. The center scene shows the rebellion with Korah and the conspirators being driven out by Moses and Aaron, as high priest wearing the papal tiara. Moses is presented with rays of light. To the left, the ground opens and the two principal conspirators sink into it. The children of Korah are spared the fate of their father.

The painting is framed by golden faux-architecture with an inscribed titulus above. The texts attached to the paintings of the Sistine Chapel inform the educated congregants in the papal chapel of the subject matter of the paintings; the tituli work to reveal both the identity of the figures, the content of the scenes with the Biblical narratives, and their exegesis. In the background of the painting is a Roman triumphal arch modelled closely on the Arch of Constantine, from the late antique period, which also included elements of earlier imperial monuments. The real Arch of Constantine's inscription is replaced by a cautionary inscription paraphrased from the Vulgate translation of Hebrews 5:4:

nemo♦sibi♦assum

mat♦honorem♦nisi

vocatus♦adeo

tanquam♦aaron

(And no man taketh this honour [the priesthood] unto himself, but he that is called of God, as was Aaron. – kjv)

The intended message of the painting is clear, no one should doubt the authority of the Pope over the Church. The power of the papacy was constantly being questioned at the time.

== See also ==
- List of works by Sandro Botticelli

== Notes ==
1.or Core in Latin and some English translations.

== Sources ==
- Santi, Bruno (2001). "Botticelli". I protagonisti dell'arte italiana. Florence: Scala.
