= Sant'Ambrogio Altarpiece (Botticelli) =

Painting by Sandro Botticelli

Madonna and Child with Six Saints
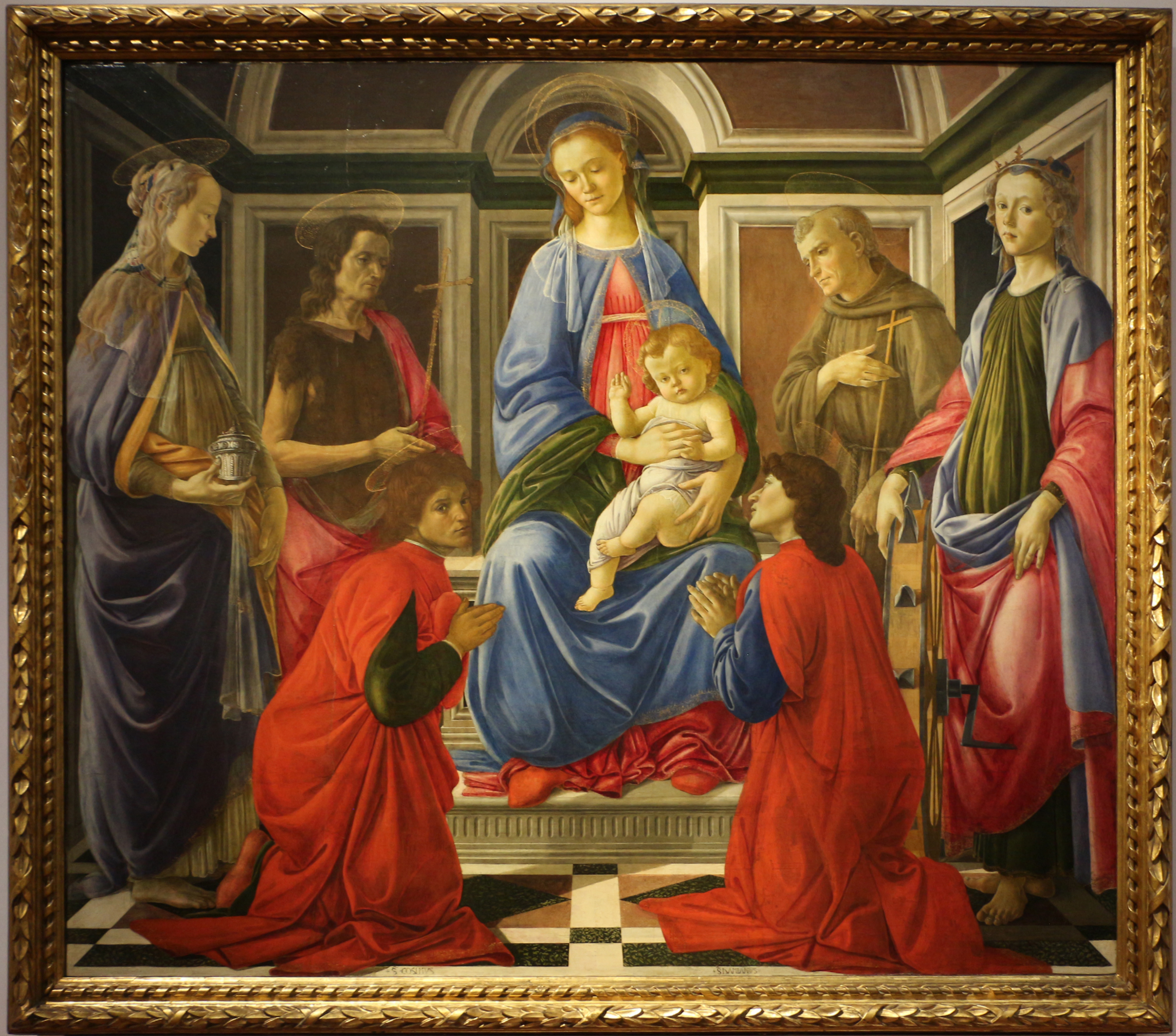
- Artist: Sandro Botticelli
- Year: c. 1470
- Medium: Tempera on panel
- Dimensions: 167 cm × 195 cm (66 in × 77 in)
- Location: Uffizi, Florence

The Madonna and Child with Six Saints, also known as Sant'Ambrogio Altarpiece, is a painting by the Italian Renaissance master Sandro Botticelli, finished around 1470. It is housed in the Galleria degli Uffizi, in Florence.

It portrays the Virgin holding Jesus as the Christ Child enthroned with the saints Mary Magdalene, John the Baptist, Francis of Assisi, Catherine of Alexandria and, kneeling, Cosmas and Damian (patrons of the House of Medici). It is in fact most likely that the latter are portraits of Medici members. Lorenzo il Magnifico and his brother Giuliano have been considered. This painting is an example of sacra conversazione, in which the Madonna and Child are surrounded by saints.

== See also ==
- List of works by Sandro Botticelli
