= Madonna of the Rose Garden (Botticelli) =

Painting by Sandro Botticelli

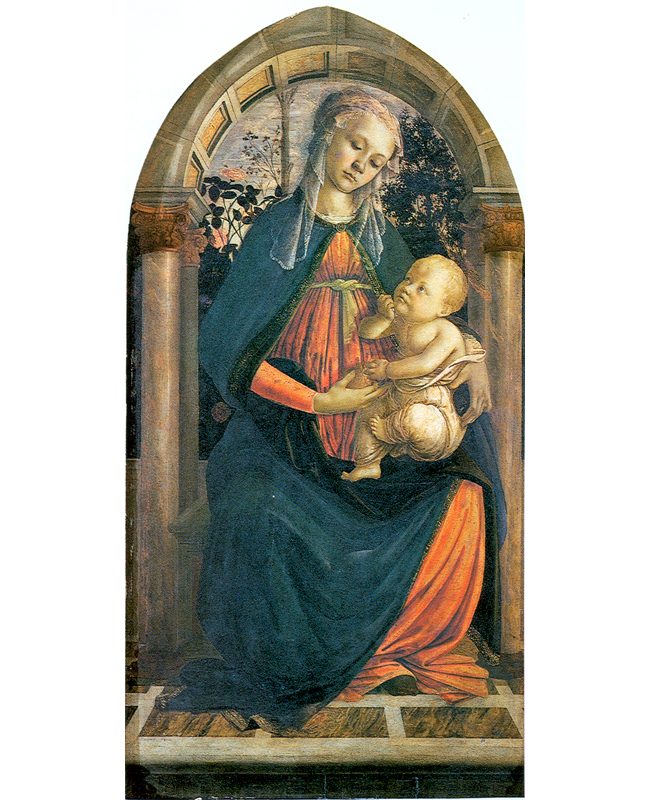
- Artist: Sandro Botticelli
- Year: 1469–1470
- Medium: tempera on panel
- Dimensions: 124 cm × 64 cm (49 in × 25 in)
- Location: Uffizi Gallery, Florence

The Madonna of the Rose Garden is a tempera painting on panel by the Italian Renaissance painter from Florence, Sandro Botticelli between 1469 and 1470. It is one of his earliest paintings and is now in the Uffizi Gallery in Florence, Italy.

== History ==
The work was in the Chamber of Commerce of Florence which leads to the hypothesis that like Botticelli's earlier painting, the Madonna della loggia, it had been commissioned either by the Wool Guild or the Tribunale della Mercanzia.

Wilhelm von Bode was the first to date the work to the artist's juvenile phase, in particular to the period of Verrocchio, 1469–1470, which has since been confirmed by other scholars.

== Description and style ==
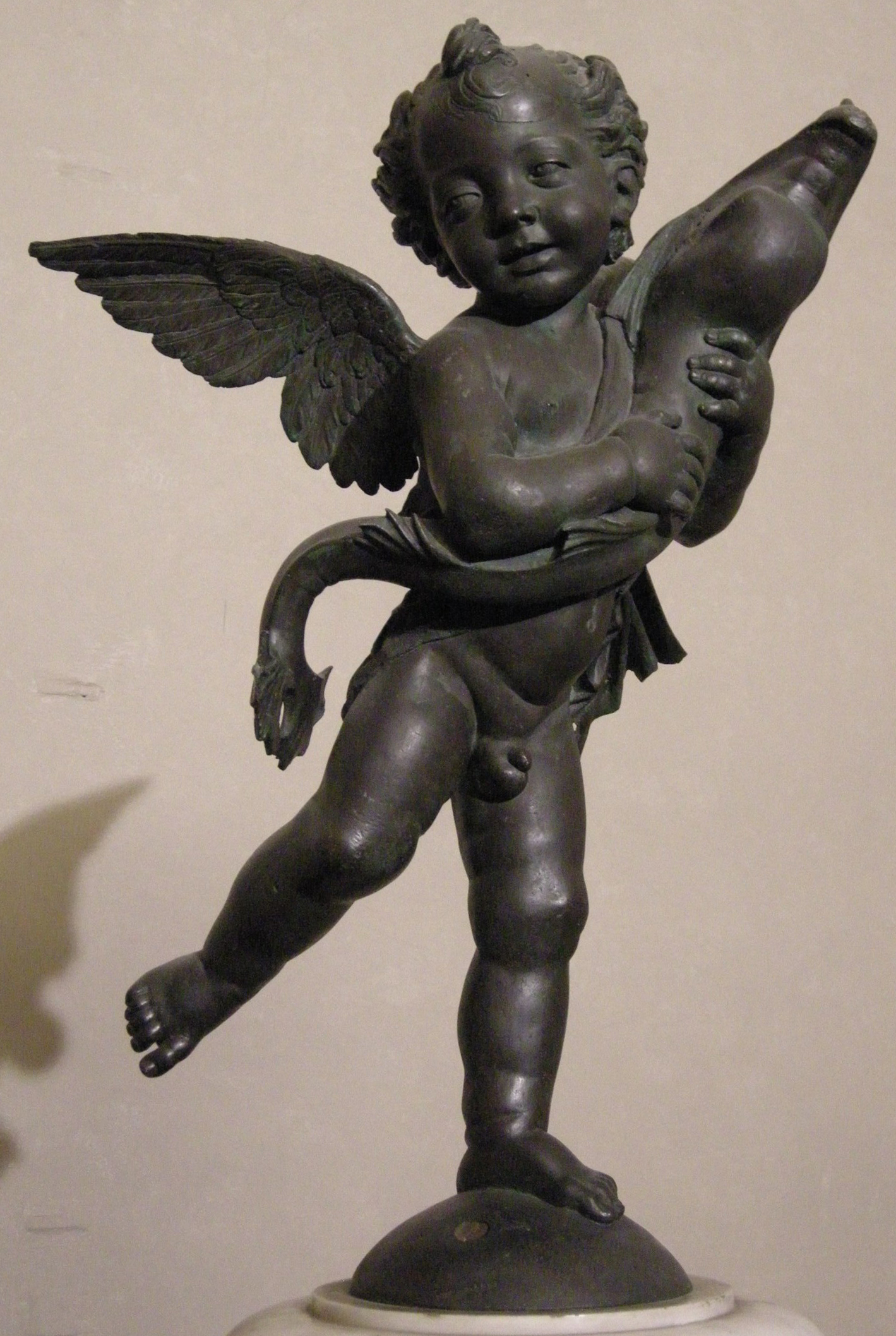
Verrocchio's Putto con delfino

The painting measures 124 cm × 64 cm (49 in × 25 in). It depicts the Virgin Mary, with a pensive attitude, holding the Christ Child on her knees beneath a loggia with columns supporting a semicircular arch with a coffered ceiling, framing the head of the Virgin and following the curved profile of the board. Behind Mary extends a garden with its pink roses dominating the foreground. Below her is a floor with framed marble tiles which demonstrates the painter's mastery of perspective technique.

The roses symbolize one of the titles of Mary, "Mystical Rose". The pomegranate, which Mary holds in her hand and which the Child is tasting, symbolizes fertility, royalty, and with its red color, the blood of the Passion of Jesus.

The work shows incisive use of chiaroscuro reminiscent of Verrocchio, in whose workshop Botticelli may have trained. The same type of child, with a large oval head and joyful lively expression, can be seen in Verrocchio's sculpture Putto con delfino from the same period. The figure of Mary is elongated and loosely posed, much more so than in the works of Filippo Lippi, another of the young Botticelli's models.

There are some uncertainties in space such as the disproportion of the architectural background which is too small compared to the figure of Mary and also compared to the flowers in the garden behind her.

== See also ==
- List of works by Sandro Botticelli
- Madonna of the Rose Garden (disambiguation)

== Sources ==
- Silvia Malaguzzi, Botticelli. Firenze, 2009. English ed. p. 15 Google books
- L'opera completa del Botticelli, collana Classici dell'arte Rizzoli, Rizzoli, Milan, 1978.
- Bruno Santi, Botticelli, in I protagonisti dell'arte italiana, Scala Group, Florence 2001 ISBN 8881170914
- Pierluigi De Vecchi, Elda Cerchiari, I tempi dell'arte, volume 2, Éditions Bompiani, Milan, 1999 ISBN 88-451-7212-0
- Gloria Fossi, Uffizi, Giunti, Florence, 2004 ISBN 88-09-03675-1
