= Portrait of a Lady Known as Smeralda Brandini =

Painting by Sandro Botticelli

Portrait of a Lady known as Smeralda Brandini Woman at a Window
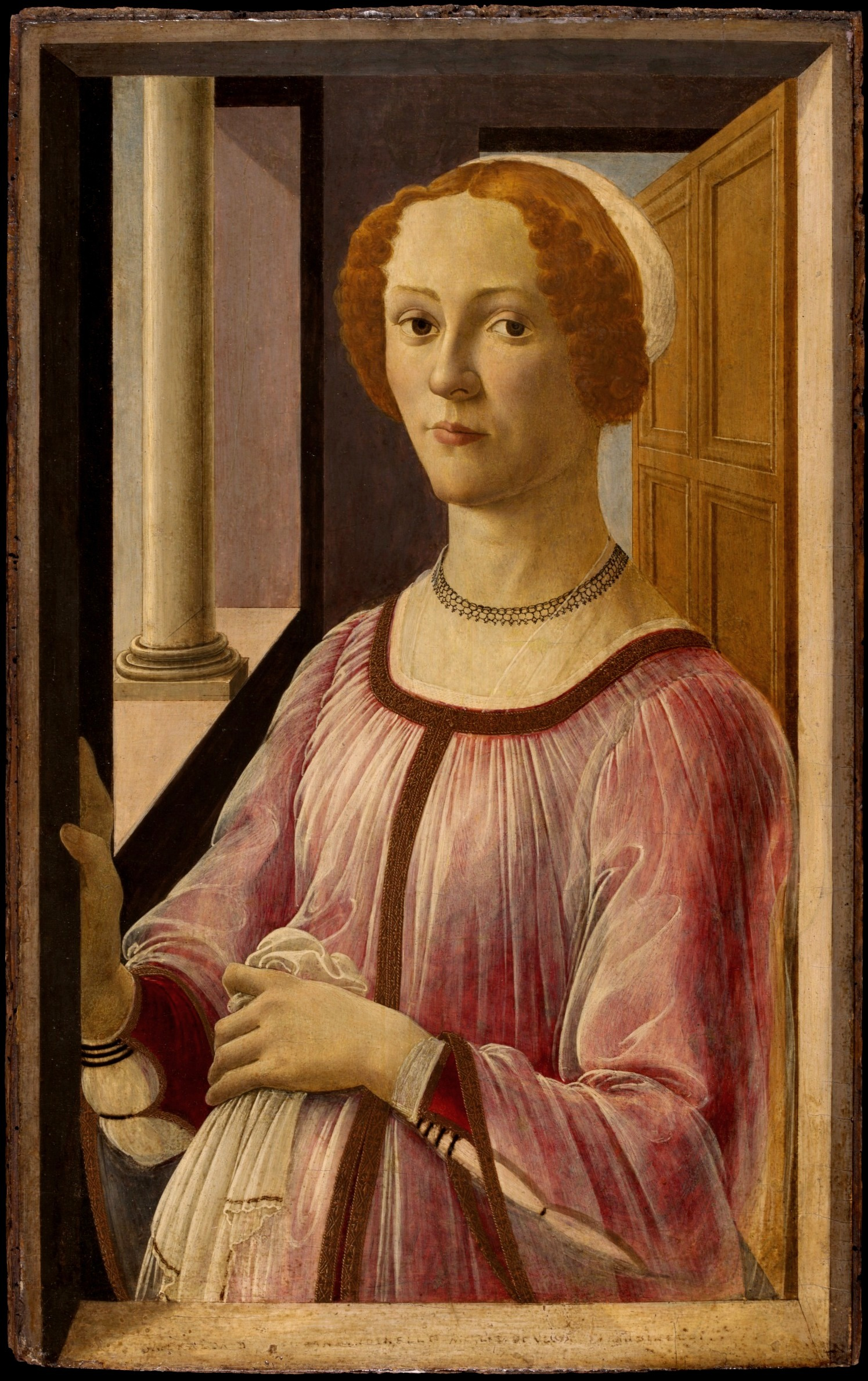
- Artist: Sandro Botticelli
- Year: c. 1475
- Medium: Tempera on panel
- Dimensions: 65.7 cm × 41 cm (25.9 in × 16 in)
- Location: Victoria and Albert Museum, London

The Portrait of Smeralda Brandini is a tempera on panel painting by the Italian Renaissance artist Sandro Botticelli of about 1475, in the Victoria and Albert Museum, London (museum no. CAI.100).

== Sitter and author ==
The identification of the sitter is based on the old, but probably not original, inscription on the windowsill at the bottom of the picture Smeralda di M.Bandinelli Moglie di VI... Bandinelli, who has been identified as the grandmother of the sculptor Baccio Bandinelli. It is likely that the inscription was added at a later date, as the sculptor only took that surname in 1530.

On the evidence of the inscription, the portrait may be of Esmeralda (Smeralda) Donati Brandini, the wife of Viviano Brandini, mother of the prominent Florentine goldsmith Michelangelo de Viviano de Brandini of Gaiuole, and grandmother of the sculptor Baccio Bandinelli (the son of Michelangelo and his noble wife Catarina, a daughter of Taddeo Ugolino). From archive documents it is known that in 1469 Smeralda was 30; her husband Viviano 38; their children Michelangelo 12, Giovanbatista 2, and Lucrezia 10.

It has been suggested that the portrait was painted by one of Botticelli's assistants during the 1470s. William Michael Rossetti said: "Leading critics will now have it that the portrait is not the work of Botticelli himself, but of someone for whom they have invented the name 'Amico di Sandro'". The Victoria & Albert Museum attributes the painting to Botticelli himself. It was once suspected that the portrait was one of Ignazio Hugford II's forgeries.

== Composition ==
Art historians point out changing conventions of portraiture in Botticelli's painting: "earlier Florentine portraits were in profile. The woman's three-quarter pose, with her hand on the window frame, was Botticelli's own invention." The portrait is thought to be the first example of a three-quarter pose in Florentine portrait painting. "By abandoning the profile pose traditionally used in depictions of Renaissance women, Botticelli brought a new sense of movement into the portrait."

The painting helped art historians to identify the sheer overdress worn by the Mona Lisa, a "similar" guarnello. The sitter also wears a cotta, a light summer gown.

== Provenance ==
By the early 19th century (1805) the portrait was in the collection of Comte James de Pourtalès Gorgier (1776–1855) in Paris. A catalogue of public sales printed in France in 1866 records the sale of the picture by the comte de Pourtalès Gorgier for 3,400 francs in 1865. Charles Augustus Howell bought it on behalf of Dante Gabriel Rossetti in 1867 at Christie's; Rossetti boasted that he had it for £20. It was bequeathed to the V&A with the collection of his patron Constantine Alexander Ionides, who had bought it from Rossetti for £315 in the 1880s.

Dante Gabriel Rossetti referred to the painting in his comments on his poem "For Spring, by Sandro Botticelli":

What masque of what old wind-withered New-Year
Honours this Lady?* Flora, wanton-eyed
For birth, and with all flowrets prankt and pied

with his reference: * The same Lady, here surrounded by the masque of Spring, is evidently the subject of a portrait by Botticelli formerly in the Pourtales collection in Paris. This portrait is inscribed "Smeralda Bandinelli". Rossetti's suggestion that the portrait depicted the model Botticelli used for his Spring now seems unlikely.

== Links ==
- Official page

== See also ==
- List of works by Sandro Botticelli

== Articles ==
- Gail S. Weinberg. D.G. Rossetti's ownership of Botticelli's 'Smeralda Brandini' in The Burlington Magazine, January 2004
