= Virgin and Child with Two Angels (Botticelli, Strasbourg) =

Painting by Sandro Botticelli

Virgin and Child with two Angels
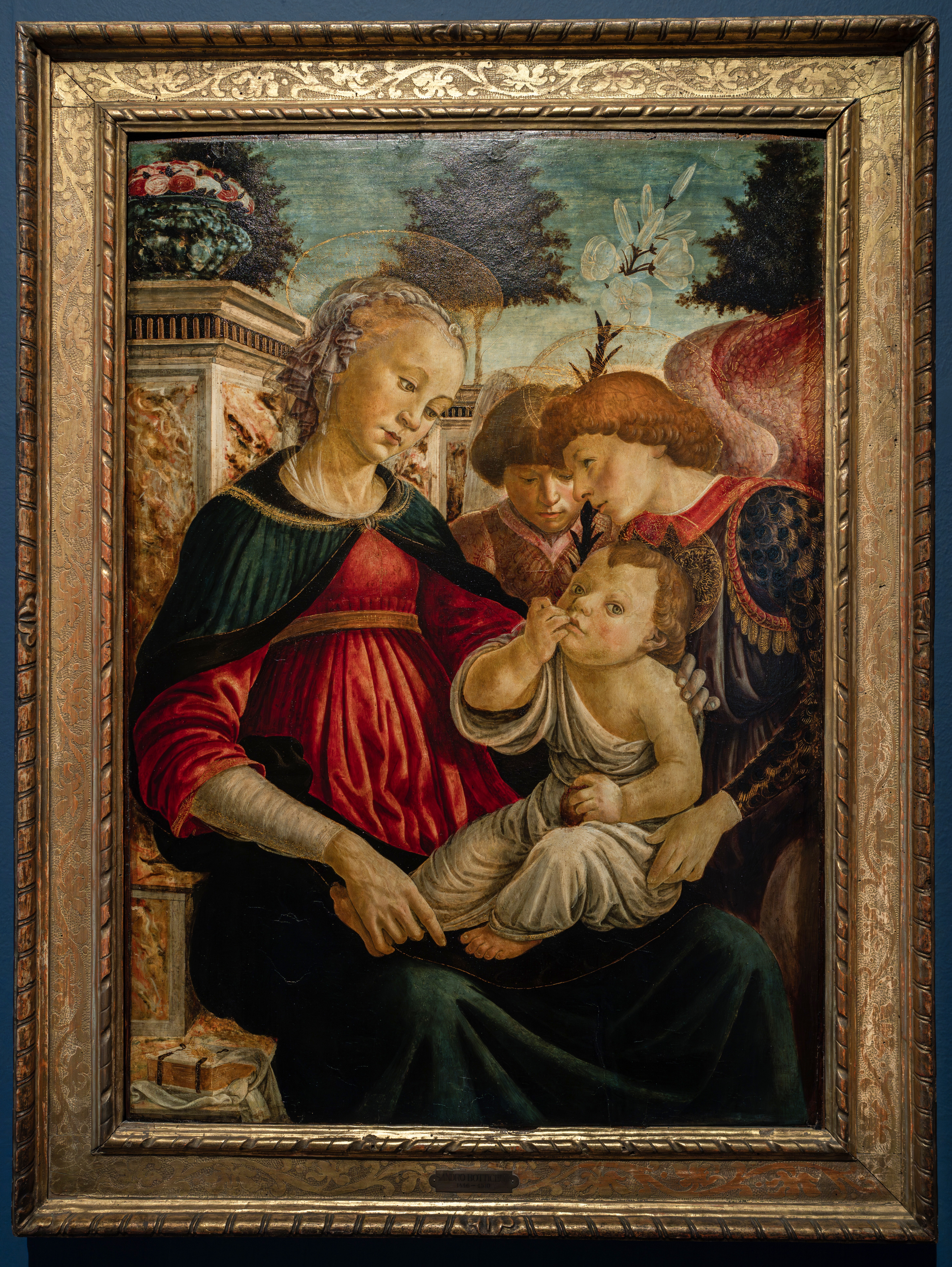
- Artist: Sandro Botticelli
- Year: circa 1468–1469
- Medium: tempera and oil painting on panel
- Movement: Quattrocento; Florentine painting Catholic art
- Subject: Madonna and Child
- Dimensions: 107 cm × 75 cm (42 in × 30 in)
- Location: Musée des Beaux-Arts, Strasbourg
- Accession: 1908

Virgin and Child with two Angels is a panel painting by the Italian Renaissance painter Sandro Botticelli. It is on display in the Musée des Beaux-Arts of Strasbourg, France. Its inventory number is 558.

Owing to its comparatively poor condition, due to the peeling off of some tempera layers as well as some ancient restoration attempts, the painting had not unanimously been attributed to Botticelli himself: critics like Bernard Berenson, who had at first declared it to be genuine, later attributed it to Botticelli's workshop. Today, art historians largely agree that it is indeed an early painting by Sandro Botticelli. Some disagreement existed on how early, given that the painting displays clear influences of Botticelli's master Filippo Lippi (which would put it in the early 1460s), but also an obvious knowledge of the works of Andrea del Verrocchio (which would put it in the later 1460s). It is now agreed upon that the painting was made in the year 1468 or 1469.

Virgin and Child with two Angels was bought in London by Karl Trübner in 1904, from the heirs of Horatio Granville Murray-Stewart (1834–1904), former High Sheriff of Donegal. It was inherited by the Strasbourg museum in 1908, together with other paintings from the Trübner collection, such as Van Everdingen's Nordic Landscape with a Castle on a Hill.

== See also ==
- List of works by Sandro Botticelli
