= Madonna of the Book =

Painting by Sandro Botticelli

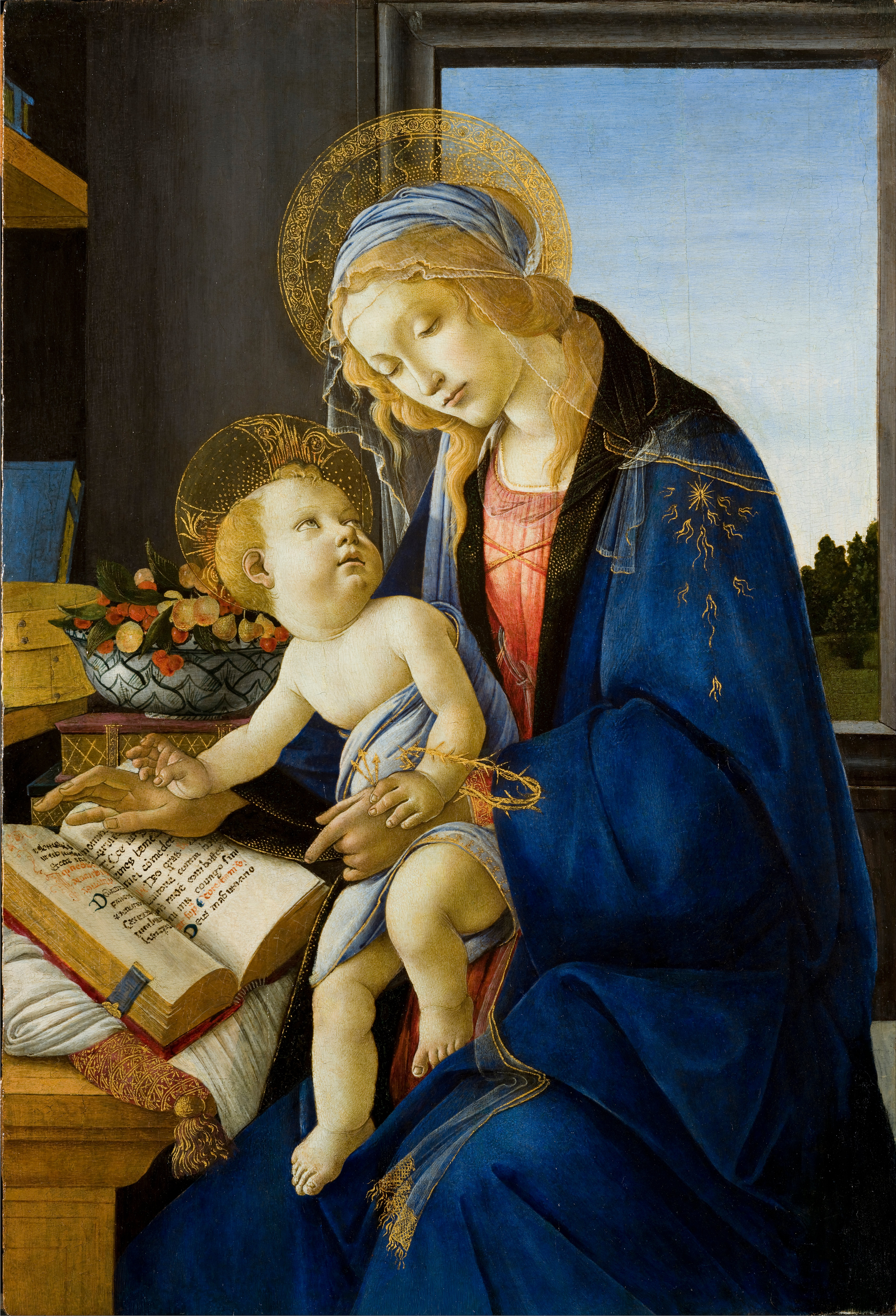
- Artist: Sandro Botticelli
- Year: c. 1480–1481
- Medium: Tempera on panel
- Dimensions: 58 cm × 39.5 cm (23 in × 15.6 in)
- Location: Museo Poldi Pezzoli, Milan, Italy

The Madonna of the Book, or the Madonna del Libro, is a small painting by the Italian Renaissance artist Sandro Botticelli, and is preserved in the Poldi Pezzoli Museum in Milan. The painting is executed in tempera on panel. It dates from between 1480 and 1481.

== Description ==
The Madonna of the Book is a soft and elegant work, in which Mary and the Child Jesus are seated by a window in the corner of a room. She holds a Book of Hours, the Horae Beatae Mariae Virginis, prayer books for laymen common in the thirteenth to sixteenth centuries. The infant is gazing at his mother whilst she is absorbed in reading the book. The hands of both mother and son are positioned similarly, with the right hands open as in a gesture of blessing, and left hands closed.

Symbolizing the Passion of Jesus, the Christ Child is holding the three nails of the cross, and the crown of thorns. These are probably later additions, added to make the message more explicit. This is the conventional representation in the Christian iconography. In addition, the fruit in the bowl has an emblematic meaning. The cherries represent the blood of Christ or are an allusion to Paradise, plums indicate the tenderness between Mary and the Child, and the figs are characteristic of the Resurrection.

Mary's blue robe, a color she is often depicted wearing, has the symbolic meanings of purity, heaven, and royalty. (Note: "blue as divine wisdom and contemplation, things heavenly .... joys of heavenly existence ... colors represent purity of the soul, the sins of humanity washed clean with blood of love (the sacrifice on the cross)) In this painting, as in Botticelli's other large series, the Madonna is portrayed as being serious, thoughtful and focused. (Note: "In Botticelli's major early works (Fortitude and St. Sebastian) he changes the appearance of muscular energy and physical action as found in Verrocchio's work. The characters in Botticelli's work are displayed as melancholy and thoughtful.")

Botticelli interprets the scene with a sensitivity and love for small details: the set of boxes and the maiolica bowl of lush fruits are depicted as a still life; the pages of the book, the garments, and the transparent veils exhibit a realistic tactile quality. The composition is refined with a good balance. Botticelli painted with subtle differences in colour, and he was able to put colours together so that they complement each other admirably. The painting is adorned with gold filigree decorating the clothes and objects. The use of gold was the result of the contractual agreement he made with the commissioner, and was included in the price of the painting. (Note: "Known also as the Madonna of the Book, this painting represents the Virgin and Child in a domestic setting, intent on reading a volume, perhaps a Book of Hours. A window is open on the landscape at twilight, but the diffused light which transforms the space into a mystical setting seems to emanate from the figures themselves.) Dating from about 1480, the painting shows all the elements of Botticelli's mature poetic style: a delicate, elegant linearity, a style which is still far from the intense pathos of his late work. The identity of his patron is unknown.

The interrelationship of light, shapes and voids confers an ethereal quality to the work. (Note: "The glimmer which pervades them seems to be unleashed by these figures and it spreads throughout the surrounding spaces. Besides the light, even the pyramid-like layout of the two sacred figures feeds the perception of an absolutely perfect moment.") Indeed, the painting might be considered as newly rediscovered, as a recent restoration revealed a luminescent sky and bright morning aura, which had been obscured by layers of centuries-old varnish. One is reminded of other Marian images made prior to the year 1470. Botticelli might have been influenced by Filippo Lippi's Madonna and Child with an Angel from the Hospital of the Innocents in Florence.

Botticelli and the Madonna of the Book were the subject of renewed interest in the 19th century. In its "extraordinary beauty" it appealed to Italians in particular who saw in it a source of national identity, during Italian unification ("Risorgimento"). Among Botticelli's admirers was Gian Giacomo Poldi Pezzoli, who bequeathed his private collection and his apartment to the public. Dr Annalisa Zanni, the Poldi Pezzoli Museum director, recently discovered more about Botticelli's technique and use of materials, as exemplified in the Madonna of the Book. For example, she discovered that Botticelli's top layer of blue was lapis lazuli, a "very precious and very expensive ingredient, indicating it was commissioned by a highly prestigious patron".

It is housed in the Museo Poldi Pezzoli in Milan, Italy. (Note: A larger, more detailed copy is displayed at the Museum of Biblical Art (Dallas), Texas.)

== See also ==
- List of works by Sandro Botticelli
