= Portrait of Giuliano de' Medici (Botticelli, Berlin) =

Painting by Sandro Botticelli

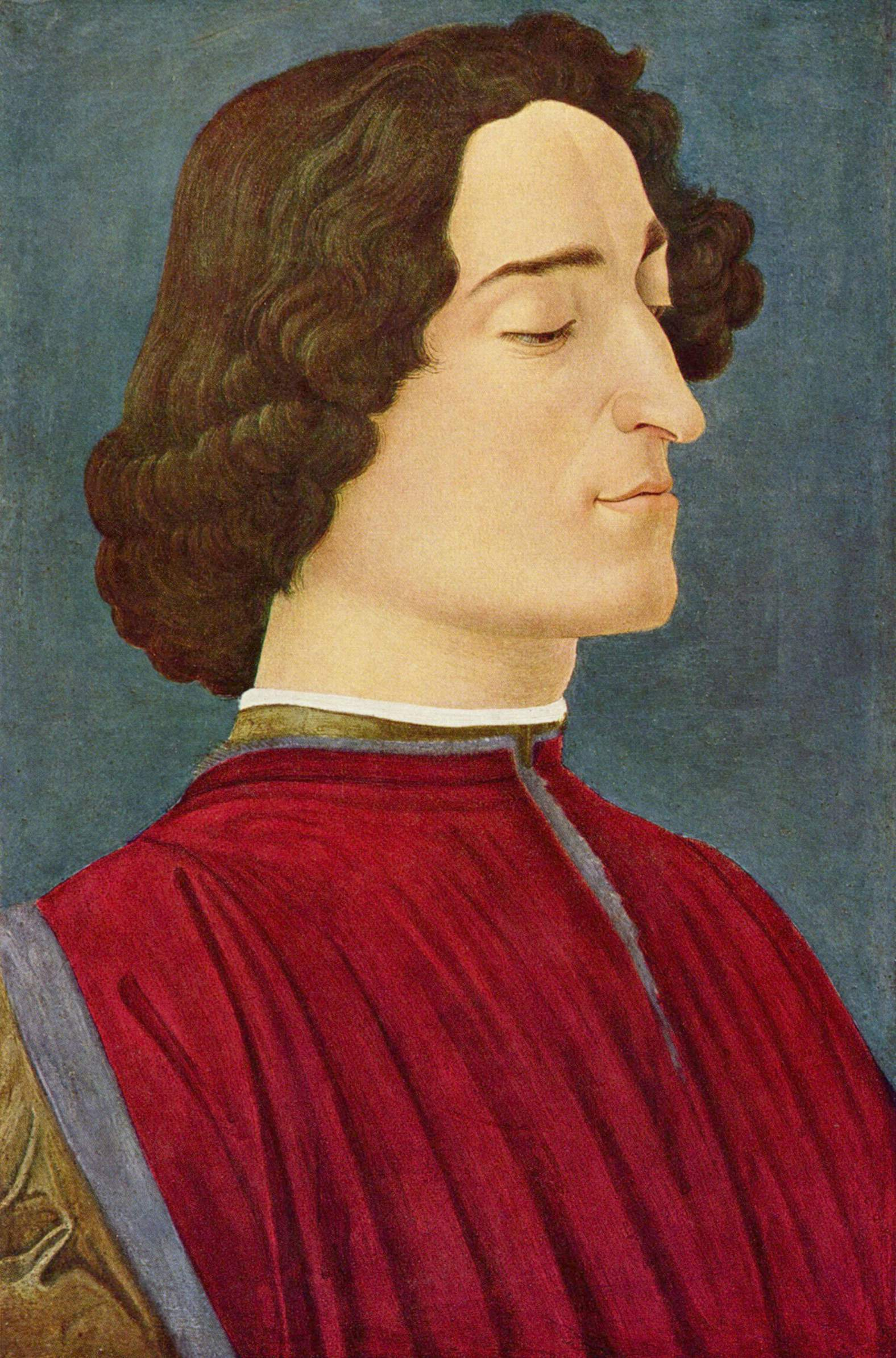
- Artist: Sandro Botticelli
- Year: 1478
- Type: Panel
- Dimensions: 54 cm × 36 cm (21 in × 14 in)
- Location: Gemäldegalerie, Berlin

The Portrait of Giuliano de' Medici is a painting of Giuliano de' Medici (1453–1478) by the Italian Renaissance painter Sandro Botticelli, probably painted soon before Giuliano was assassinated in the Pazzi conspiracy in 1478. It belongs to the Berlin State Museums, and is in the Gemäldegalerie, Berlin.

It is believed to be the earliest of a number of versions by Botticelli.

Giuliano de' Medici was murdered in 1478 at the age of 25 during the Pazzi conspiracy in the Florence Cathedral or Duomo di Firenze. The Pazzi were rivals to the Medici. Giuliano de' Medici was the younger brother of Lorenzo il Magnifico. Other versions of this Sandro Botticelli portrait are in the Accademia Carrara, Bergamo, Italy and the National Gallery of Art, Washington D.C.

== See also ==
- List of works by Sandro Botticelli
