= Madonna della Loggia (Botticelli) =

Painting by Sandro Botticelli

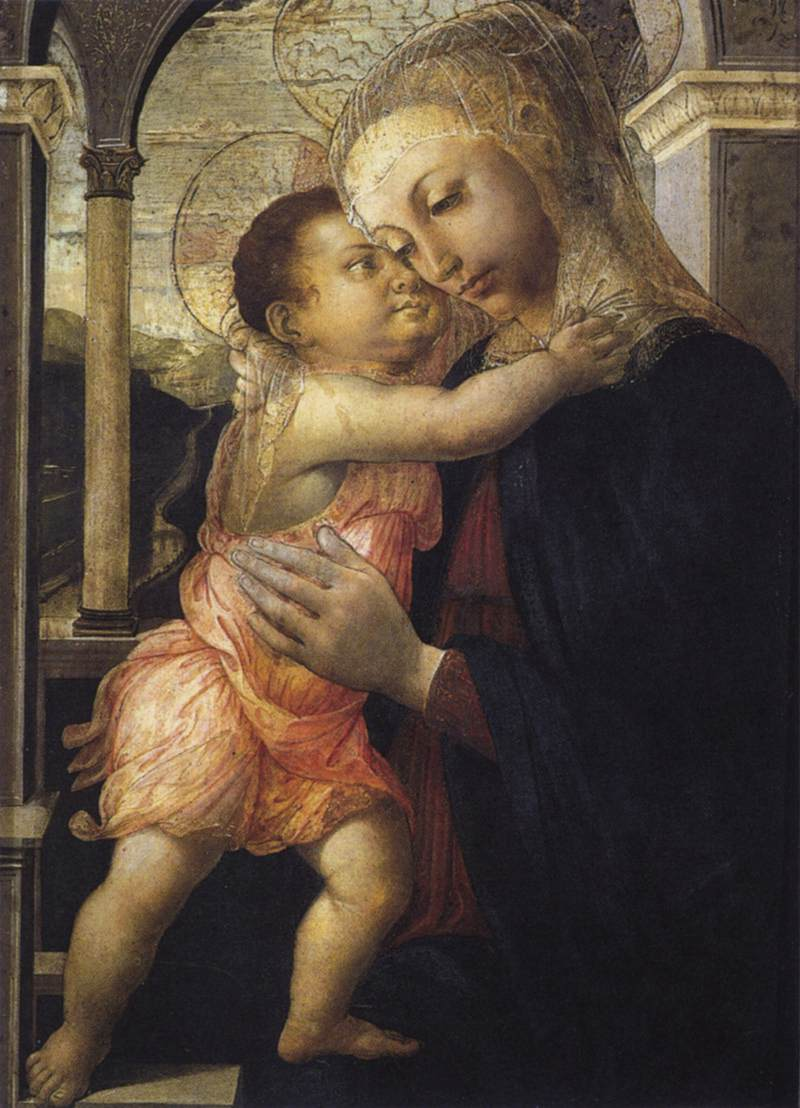
- Artist: Sandro Botticelli
- Year: 1467
- Medium: Tempera on panel
- Dimensions: 72 cm × 50 cm (28 in × 20 in)
- Location: Uffizi, Florence

The Madonna della Loggia is a painting attributed to the Italian Renaissance artist Sandro Botticelli, dating to c. 1467. A tempera on panel work, it is located in the loggia of the Uffizi, Florence, Italy.

This is one of the earliest works of Botticelli where he painted a portrait of the Virgin Mary with Jesus Christ as a child, sitting in a loggia. Madonna is wearing dark blue cloak with bright red dress underneath it. Blue in Madonna's clothes represents her purity and her red dress is a symbol of love. She has a head covering and a slightly visible, translucent halo. Baby Jesus is painted in a light pink robe, also with a big bright halo above his head. The loggia where Madonna and a Child are seated is depicted in brown and cream colors. On the background there is a green landscape with a road supposedly leading to the town.

The painting is 70 x 147 cm in size. It was given to the Uffizi in 1784 by the Chamber of Commerce and Arts.

== History of the Madonna ==
The Madonna della Loggia is one of the earliest works of Botticelli. This painting's style was influenced by Sandro's master, Filippo Lippi, one of the greatest Renaissance artists. Shortly after Botticelli left his master's studio, he moved to work under Andrea Verrocchio in the late 1460s, when he completed painting of Madonna della Loggia. There is an opinion that this artwork was inspired by Lippi's Madonna with Child, which was created around 1460 in Florence for Palazzo Medici Riccardi. However, Madonna della Loggia can also be viewed as a typical artwork influenced by a religious theme, depicting Virgin Mary holding Jesus in her hands. During the Renaissance, artists often dedicated their paintings and sculptures to Christianity, mainly the image of Jesus Christ. Italian artists used one of the most popular iconographic representation of the Virgin and the Christ, Glykophilousa, translated as "Sweet Kissing". It is the pose in which Mary appears to be "kissing" Jesus, accepting affection from her son. Madonna della Loggia is one of many examples of Glykophilousa in Renaissance images of the Madonna and Child.

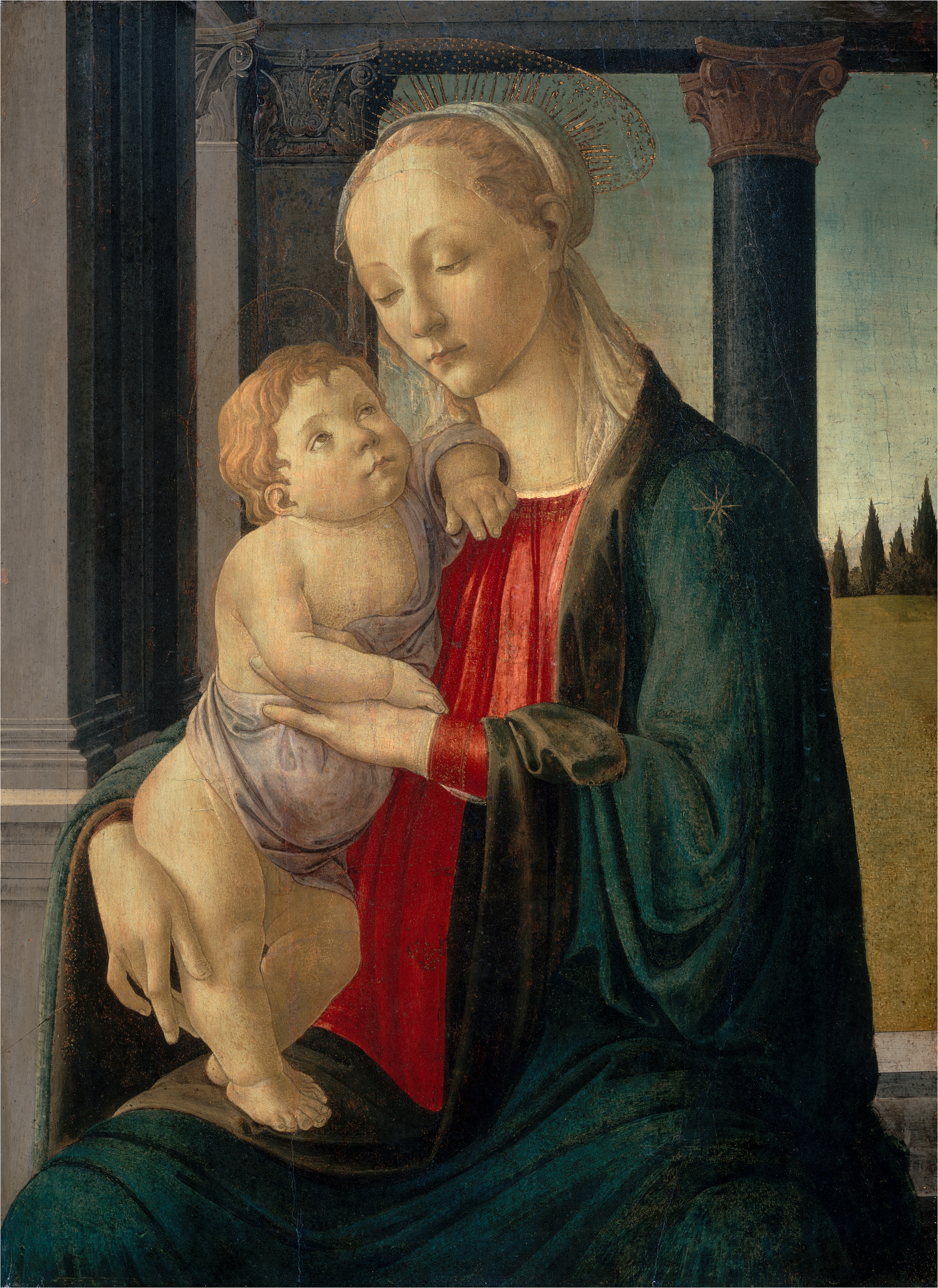
Madonna and Child, Botticelli (1470)

== Botticelli and Madonnas ==
Beginning from the mid 1460s, Botticelli worked on several paintings that have the same context as the Madonna della Loggia. He painted four works of Virgin Mary with a child and he continued to paint Madonnas in a similar manner throughout next decade. What is common for almost all his paintings is depiction of Madonna in a loggia, a so-called European porch, an outdoor area that was a part of the building. One of the most famous paintings that is known everywhere is Leonardo Da Vinci's Mona Lisa that was originally painted sitting in a loggia before parts of the paintings were cut off. However, it is still visible on the left bottom part of the painting. In Botticelli's artwork loggia is distinct and stands out on the background of the painting. It is noticeable that Botticelli paints different styles of loggias in his paintings. Madonna and Child of 1470 has closely the same loggia as Madonna della Loggia, and it does not only have a similar loggia, but the image of Mother and the Christ.

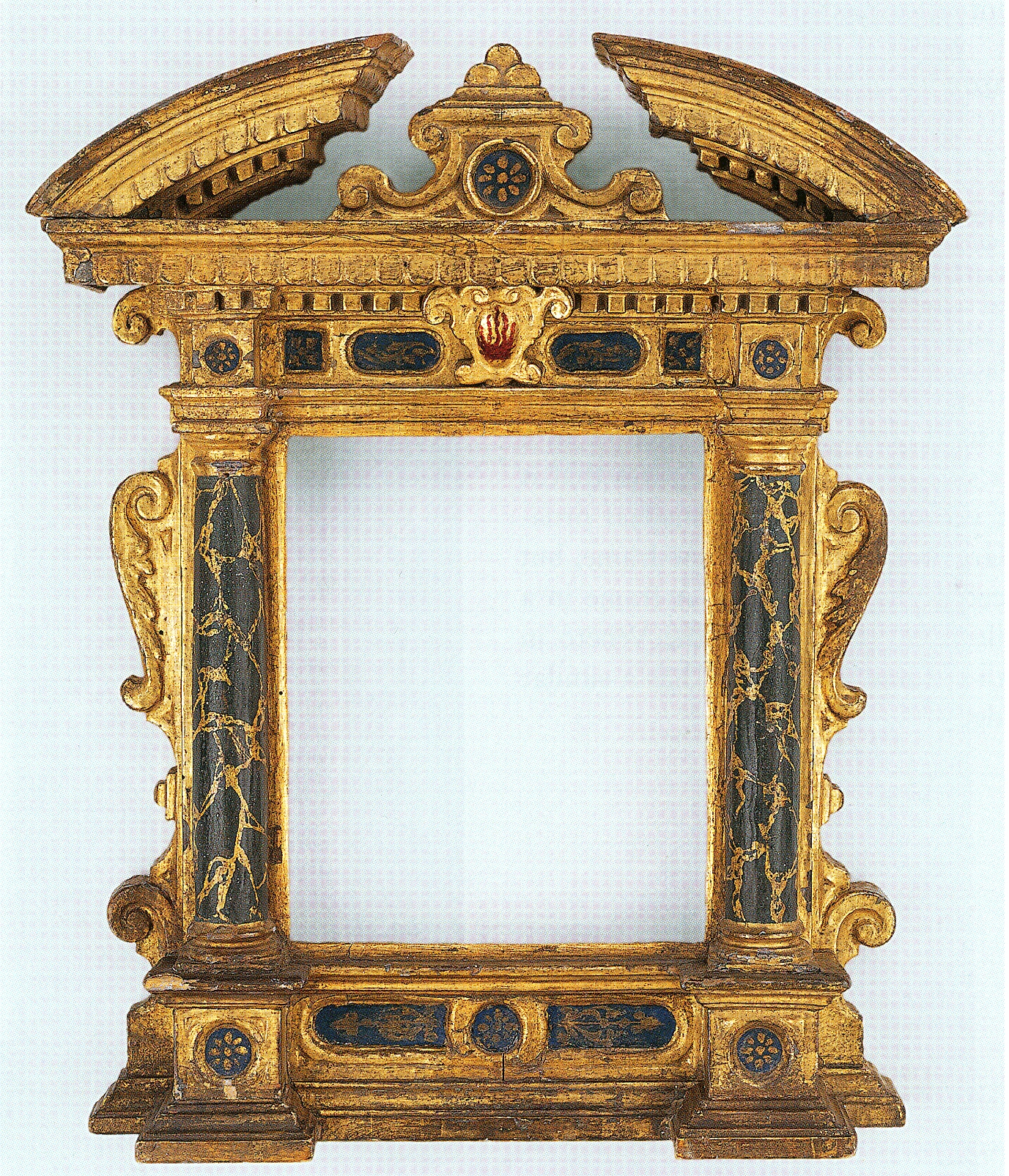
Tabernacle frame

== Restoration of the painting ==
The Madonna della Loggia was not preserved in its best condition. Even its authenticity as Botticelli's work was doubted because of the poor condition of the painting. His signature was found after conservation treatment in 2004, which also revealed other details of the painting that were missing. Apparently, the painting might have been set in a tabernacle frame, usually religious devoted massive frames, that emerged in Italy in 15th century. The Madonna della Loggia was supposedly made for "private religious devotion," so-called "colmi da camera".

== Madonna in Russia ==
The Madonna della Loggia arrived to Vladivostok, Russia for the V Eastern Economic Forum in September, 2019 and was placed for public observation in the University of Vladivostok. Later, the artwork travelled to the Primorye State Art Gallery and then, in November, migrated to St. Petersburg for the VIII International Forum of Culture in St. Petersburg, to Hermitage as a part of “Masterpieces of the World Museums at the Hermitage” series.

== See also ==
- List of works by Sandro Botticelli
