= List of paintings by Sandro Botticelli =

The following is a list of panel paintings, works on canvas and frescoes by the Italian painter Sandro Botticelli. His drawings, such as those of the Divine Comedy, are excluded. It is not indicated if some works might be executed with more or less participation by his workshop.

| Image | Title | Year | Technique | Dimensions | Place |
|---|---|---|---|---|---|
| | Virgin and Child Supported by an Angel in a Garland | 1465–1467 | Tempera on panel | 115.2 × 70 cm | Ajaccio, Musée Fesch |
| | Virgin and Child with an Angel | 1465–1467 | Tempera on panel | 87 × 60 cm | Florence, Ospedale degli Innocenti |
| | The Virgin and Child with Two Angels and the Young St. John the Baptist | 1465–1470 | Tempera on panel | 85 × 62 cm | Florence, Galleria dell'Accademia |
| | Madonna and Child | 1465–1470 | Tempera on panel | 73 × 50 cm | Paris, Musée du Louvre |
| | Madonna della Loggia | c. 1467 | Tempera on panel | 72 × 50 cm | Florence, Uffizi |
| | Madonna and Child | c. 1467 | Tempera on panel | 71 × 51 cm | Avignon, Musée du Petit Palais |
| | Madonna and Child with St. John the Baptist | 1468 | Tempera on panel | 90 × 67 cm | Paris, Musée du Louvre |
| | Madonna and Child with Adoring Angel | c. 1468 | Tempera on panel | 88.9 × 68 cm | Pasadena, Norton Simon Museum |
| | Virgin and Child with Two Angels | c. 1468–1469 | Tempera on panel | 100 × 71 cm | Naples, Galleria Nazionale di Capodimonte |
| | Virgin and Child with Two Angels | c. 1468–1469 | Tempera and oil on panel | 107 × 75 cm | Strasbourg, Musée des Beaux-Arts |
| | Portrait of a Young Man | c. 1469 | Tempera on panel | 51 × 33.7 cm | Florence, Palazzo Pitti |
| | Madonna in Glory with Seraphim | 1469–1470 | Tempera on panel | 120 × 65 cm | Florence, Uffizi |
| | Madonna of the Sea | 1469–1470 | Tempera on panel | 40 × 28 cm | Florence, Galleria dell'Accademia |
| | Fortitude | 1470 | Tempera on panel | 167 × 87 cm | Florence, Uffizi |
| | Adoration of the Kings | c. 1470 | Tempera on panel | 50.2 × 136 cm | London, National Gallery |
| | Madonna with Child and Five Angels | c. 1470 | Tempera on panel | 58 × 40 cm | Paris, Musée du Louvre |
| | Madonna of the Rosegarden (Madonna del Roseto) | c. 1470 | Tempera on panel | 124 × 64 cm | Florence, Uffizi |
| | Madonna and Child with Six Saints | c. 1470 | Tempera on panel | 170 × 194 cm | Florence, Uffizi |
| | Virgin and Child with an Angel | c. 1470-1474 | Tempera on panel | 85.2 × 65 cm | Boston, Isabella Stewart Gardner Museum |
| | Madonna and Child | c. 1470 | Tempera on panel | 74.5 × 54.5 cm | Washington, National Gallery of Art |
| | Madonna delle Grazie | c. 1470 | Tempera on panel | 80 × 58 cm | Private collection |
| | The Discovery of the Body of Holofernes | c. 1470 | Tempera on panel | 31 × 25 cm | Florence, Uffizi |
| | The Return of Judith to Bethulia | 1470–1472 | Tempera on panel | 31 × 24 cm | Florence, Uffizi |
| | Portrait of Esmeralda Brandini | 1470–1475 | Tempera on panel | 65.7 × 41 cm | London, Victoria and Albert Museum |
| | Adoration of the Kings | 1470–1475 | Tempera on panel | diameter 130.8 cm | London, National Gallery |
| | Nativity | 1473–1475 | Fresco transferred to canvas | 160 × 140 cm | Columbia Museum of Art |
| | St. Sebastian | 1474 | Tempera on panel | 195 × 75 cm | Berlin, Gemäldegalerie |
| | Portrait of a Man with a Medal of Cosimo the Elder | c. 1474–1475 | Tempera on panel | 51.5 × 44 cm | Florence, Uffizi |
| | Portrait of a Young Woman | c. 1475 | Tempera on panel | 61 × 40 cm | Florence, Palazzo Pitti |
| | Adoration of the Magi | c. 1475 | Tempera on panel | 111 × 134 cm | Florence, Uffizi |
| | Portrait of a Lady | c. 1475 | Tempera on panel | 53.2 × 37.8 cm | Altenburg, Lindenau-Museum |
| | Portrait of Giuliano de' Medici | c. 1475 | Tempera on panel | 54 × 36 cm | Bergamo, Accademia Carrara |
| | Saint Francis of Assisi with Angels | c. 1475–1480 | Tempera and oil on panel | 49.5 × 31.8 cm | London, National Gallery |
| | Madonna and Child | c. 1475–1485 | Tempera on panel | 85.8 × 59.1 cm | Chicago, Art Institute |
| | The Birth of Christ | 1476–1477 | Fresco | 200 × 300 cm | Florence, Basilica of Santa Maria Novella |
| | Madonna and Child with Eight Angels | c. 1478 | Tempera on panel | diameter 135 cm | Berlin, Gemäldegalerie |
| | Portrait of Giuliano de' Medici | 1478 | Tempera on panel | 54 × 36 cm | Berlin, Gemäldegalerie |
| | Portrait of Giuliano de' Medici | 1478–1482 | Tempera on panel | 75.5 × 52.5 cm | Washington, National Gallery of Art |
| | Adoration of the Magi | 1478–1482 | Tempera on panel | 70 × 104.2 cm | Washington, National Gallery of Art |
| | The Annunciation | c. 1479 | Tempera on panel | 19 × 30 cm | Glens Falls, The Hyde Collection |
| | St. Augustine | 1480 | Fresco | 152 × 112 cm | Florence, Ognissanti |
| | Portrait of a Young Woman | after 1480 | Tempera on panel | 47.5 × 35 cm | Berlin, Gemäldegalerie |
| | The Resurrected Christ | c. 1480 | Paint on wood panel (transferred) | 45.7 × 29.8 cm | Detroit Institute of Arts |
| | Madonna of the Book (Madonna del Libro) | c. 1480–1481 | Tempera on panel | 58 × 39.6 cm | Milan, Museo Poldi Pezzoli |
| | Portrait of a Young Man | 1480–1485 | Tempera and oil on panel | 37.5 × 28.3 cm | London, National Gallery |
| | Portrait of a Young Woman | 1480–1485 | Tempera on wood | 82 × 54 cm | Frankfurt, Städel Museum |
| | The Virgin Adoring the Child | 1480–1490 | Tempera on panel | diameter 58.9 cm | Washington, National Gallery of Art |
| | Annunciation | 1481 | Fresco | 243 × 550 cm | Florence, Uffizi |
| | St. Sixtus II | 1481 | Fresco | 210 × 80 cm | Vatican, Sistine Chapel |
| | Punishment of Korah, Dathan and Abiram | 1481–1482 | Fresco | 348.5 × 570 cm | Vatican, Sistine Chapel |
| | The Temptations of Christ | 1481–1482 | Fresco | 345 × 555 cm | Vatican, Sistine Chapel |
| | The Trials of Moses | 1481–1482 | Fresco | 348.5 × 558 cm | Vatican, Sistine Chapel |
| | Magnificat Madonna | 1481–1485 | Tempera on panel | diameter 118 cm | Florence, Uffizi |
| | Spring (Primavera) | c. 1482 | Tempera on panel | 203 × 314 cm | Florence, Uffizi |
| | Pallas and the Centaur | 1482–1483 | Tempera on canvas | 207 × 148 cm | Florence, Uffizi |
| | Portrait of a Young Man | c. 1482–1485 | Tempera on panel | 43.5 × 46.2 cm | Washington, National Gallery of Art |
| | The Story of Nastagio degli Onesti I | c. 1483 | Tempera on panel | 83 × 138 cm | Madrid, Museo del Prado |
| | The Story of Nastagio degli Onesti II | c. 1483 | Tempera on panel | 82 × 138 cm | Madrid, Museo del Prado |
| | The Story of Nastagio degli Onesti III | c. 1483 | Tempera on panel | 84 × 142 cm | Madrid, Museo del Prado |
| | The Story of Nastagio degli Onesti IV | c. 1483 | Tempera on panel | 83 × 142 cm | Private collection |
| | Venus and the Three Graces Presenting Gifts to a Young Woman | c. 1483–1486 | Fresco | 211 × 283 cm | Paris, Musée du Louvre |
| | A Young Man Being Introduced to the Seven Liberal Arts | c. 1483–1486 | Fresco | 237 × 269 cm | Paris, Musée du Louvre |
| | Bardi Altarpiece (The Virgin and Child Enthroned) | 1484 | Tempera on panel | 185 × 180 cm | Berlin, Gemäldegalerie |
| | Annunciation | 1485 | Tempera and gold on panel | 19.1 × 31.4 cm | New York, Metropolitan Museum of Art |
| | Venus and Mars | c. 1485 | Tempera and oil on panel | 69.2 × 173.4 cm | London, National Gallery |
| | The Birth of Venus | c. 1485 | Tempera on canvas | 172.5 × 278.5 cm | Florence, Uffizi |
| | Virgin and Child with Six Angels and the Baptist | c. 1485 | Tempera on panel | diameter 170 cm | Rome, Galleria Borghese |
| | The Virgin and Child | c. 1485 | Oil on panel | 83.2 × 55.5 cm | New Haven, Yale University Art Gallery |
| | Madonna Adoring the Child with Five Angels | 1485–1490 | Tempera on panel | diameter 132.7 cm | Baltimore Museum of Art |
| | Madonna and Child | c. 1485–1495 | Tempera on panel | diameter 34.4 cm | Chicago, Art Institute |
| | Madonna of the Pomegranate (Madonna della Melagrana) | c. 1487 | Tempera on panel | diameter 143.5 cm | Florence, Uffizi |
| | The Virgin and Child, St. John and an Angel | c. 1488 | Tempera on panel | diameter 111–108 cm | Warsaw, National Museum |
| | The Virgin and Child with Four Angels and Six Saints | c. 1488 | Tempera on panel | 268 × 280 cm | Florence, Uffizi |
| | Vision of St. Augustine | c. 1488 | Tempera on panel | 20 × 38 cm | Florence, Uffizi |
| | Christ in the Sepulchre | c. 1488 | Tempera on panel | 21 × 41 cm | Florence, Uffizi |
| | Salome with the Head of St. John the Baptist | c. 1488 | Tempera on panel | 21 × 40.5 cm | Florence, Uffizi |
| | Extraction of St. Ignatius' Heart | c. 1488 | Tempera on panel | 21 × 38 cm | Florence, Uffizi |
| | Coronation of the Virgin | 1488–1490 | Tempera on panel | 378 × 258 cm | Florence, Uffizi |
| | St. John on Patmos | 1488–1490 | Tempera on panel | 21 × 268 cm | Florence, Uffizi |
| | St. Augustine in His Cell | 1488–1490 | Tempera on panel | 21 × 268 cm | Florence, Uffizi |
| | Annunciation | 1488–1490 | Tempera on panel | 21 × 268 cm | Florence, Uffizi |
| | St. Jerome in Penitence | 1488–1490 | Tempera on panel | 21 × 268 cm | Florence, Uffizi |
| | Miracle of St. Eligius | 1488–1490 | Tempera on panel | 21 × 268 cm | Florence, Uffizi |
| | Cestello Annunciation | 1489 | Tempera on panel | 150 × 156 cm | Florence, Uffizi |
| | The Annunciation | 1490 | Tempera on canvas | 45 × 13 cm each panel | Moscow, Pushkin Museum |
| | Lamentation over the Dead Christ | c. 1490 | Tempera on panel | 140 × 207 cm | Munich, Alte Pinakothek |
| | Portrait of Michelle Marullo | c. 1490 | Tempera on canvas transferred from panel | 49 × 35 cm | Madrid, Prado Museum, loan from the Guardans-Cambó collection |
| | Madonna with Child and Two Angels | c. 1490 | Tempera on panel | diameter 115 cm | Vienna, Liechtenstein Museum |
| | The Virgin Adoring the Sleeping Christ Child | c. 1490 | Tempera and gold on canvas | 122 × 80.3 cm | Edinburgh, National Gallery of Scotland |
| | The Virgin and Child | c. 1490 | Tempera on panel | 88.9 × 55.9 cm | Cambridge, Fogg Museum |
| | St. Augustine in His Cell | 1490–1494 | Tempera on panel | 41 × 27 cm | Florence, Uffizi |
| | Madonna and Child and the Young St John the Baptist | 1490–1495 | Tempera on canvas | 134 × 92 cm | Florence, Palazzo Pitti |
| | Portrait of Lorenzo di Ser Piero Lorenzi | 1490–1495 | Tempera on panel | 50 × 36.5 cm | Philadelphia Museum of Art |
| | Virgin and Child with the Infant John the Baptist | 1490–1500 | Tempera on panel | diameter 74 cm | São Paulo Museum of Art |
| | Madonna and Child | ca. 1490 | Tempera on wood panel | 73.5 cm x 57.5 cm | Florence, Museo Stibbert |
| | Holy Trinity | 1491–1493 | Tempera on panel | 215 × 192 cm | London, Courtauld Institute of Art |
| | Virgin and Child with St. John the Baptist | 1491–1493 | Tempera on panel | 47.65 × 38.1 cm | Private collection (New York) |
| | The Virgin and Child with Three Angels (Madonna del Padiglione) | c. 1493 | Tempera on panel | diameter 65 cm | Milan, Biblioteca Ambrosiana |
| | The Annunciation | c. 1493 | Tempera and gold on panel | 51 × 62 cm | Glasgow, Kelvingrove Art Gallery and Museum |
| | Calumny of Apelles | c. 1495 | Tempera on panel | 62 × 91 cm | Florence, Uffizi |
| | Last Communion of St. Jerome | c. 1495 | Tempera on panel | 34.5 × 25.4 cm | New York, Metropolitan Museum of Art |
| | Portrait of Dante | c. 1495 | Tempera on canvas | 54.7 × 47.5 cm | Private collection |
| | Lamentation over the Dead Christ | 1495–1500 | Tempera on panel | 106 × 71 cm | Milan, Museo Poldi Pezzoli |
| | Judith Leaving the Tent of Holofernes | 1495–1500 | Tempera on panel | 36.5 × 20 cm | Amsterdam, Rijksmuseum |
| | The Descent of the Holy Ghost | 1495–1505 | Oil on panel | 207 × 230 cm | Birmingham Museums & Art Gallery |
| | The Story of Virginia | 1496–1504 | Tempera on panel | 85 × 165 cm | Bergamo, Accademia Carrara |
| | The Story of Lucretia | 1496–1504 | Tempera on panel | 83.8 × 176.8 cm | Boston, Isabella Stewart Gardner Museum |
| | St. Jerome | 1498–1505 | Tempera on canvas | 44.5 × 26 cm | Saint Petersburg, Hermitage Museum |
| | St. Dominic | 1498–1505 | Tempera on canvas | 44.5 × 26 cm | Saint Petersburg, Hermitage Museum |
| | The Mystical Nativity | 1500 | Oil on canvas | 108.6 × 74.9 cm | London, National Gallery |
| | Virgin and Child with a Pomegranate | c. 1500 | Oil on panel | 64.8 × 41.9 cm | Cardiff, National Museum of Wales |
| | Mystic Crucifixion | c. 1500 | Tempera and oil on canvas (transferred from panel) | 72.39 × 51.44 cm | Cambridge, Fogg Art Museum |
| | Christ Crowned with Thorns | c. 1500 | Tempera on panel | 47.6 × 32.3 cm | Bergamo, Accademia Carrara |
| | Transfiguration, St. Jerome, St. Augustine | c. 1500 | Tempera on panel | 27.5 × 35.5 cm | Rome, Palazzo Pallavicini-Rospigliosi |
| | Agony in the Garden | c. 1500 | Tempera on panel | 53 × 35 cm | Granada, Royal Chapel |
| | Adoration of the Child | c. 1500 | Tempera on panel | diameter 125.7 cm | Raleigh, North Carolina Museum of Art |
| | Adoration of the Christ Child | c. 1500 | Oil on panel | diameter 120.7 cm | Houston, Museum of Fine Arts |
| | Adoration of the Magi | c. 1500 | Tempera on panel | 108 × 173 cm | Florence, Uffizi |
| | Four Scenes from the Early Life of Saint Zenobius | c. 1500 | Tempera on panel | 66.7 × 149.2 cm | London, National Gallery |
| | Three Miracles of Saint Zenobius | c. 1500 | Tempera on panel | 64.8 × 139.7 cm | London, National Gallery |
| | Three Miracles of St. Zenobius | 1500–1505 | Tempera on panel | 67 × 150.5 cm | New York, Metropolitan Museum of Art |
| | Last Miracle and the Death of St. Zenobius | 1500–1505 | Tempera on panel | 66 × 182 cm | Dresden, Gemäldegalerie |
| | The Man of Sorrows | 1500-1510 | Tempera and oil on Panel | 27 1/8 by 20 1/4 in.; 69 by 51.4 cm. | Private collection |

== See also ==
- Divine Comedy illustrated by Botticelli
