= The Man of Sorrows (Botticelli) =

Painting by Sandro Botticelli

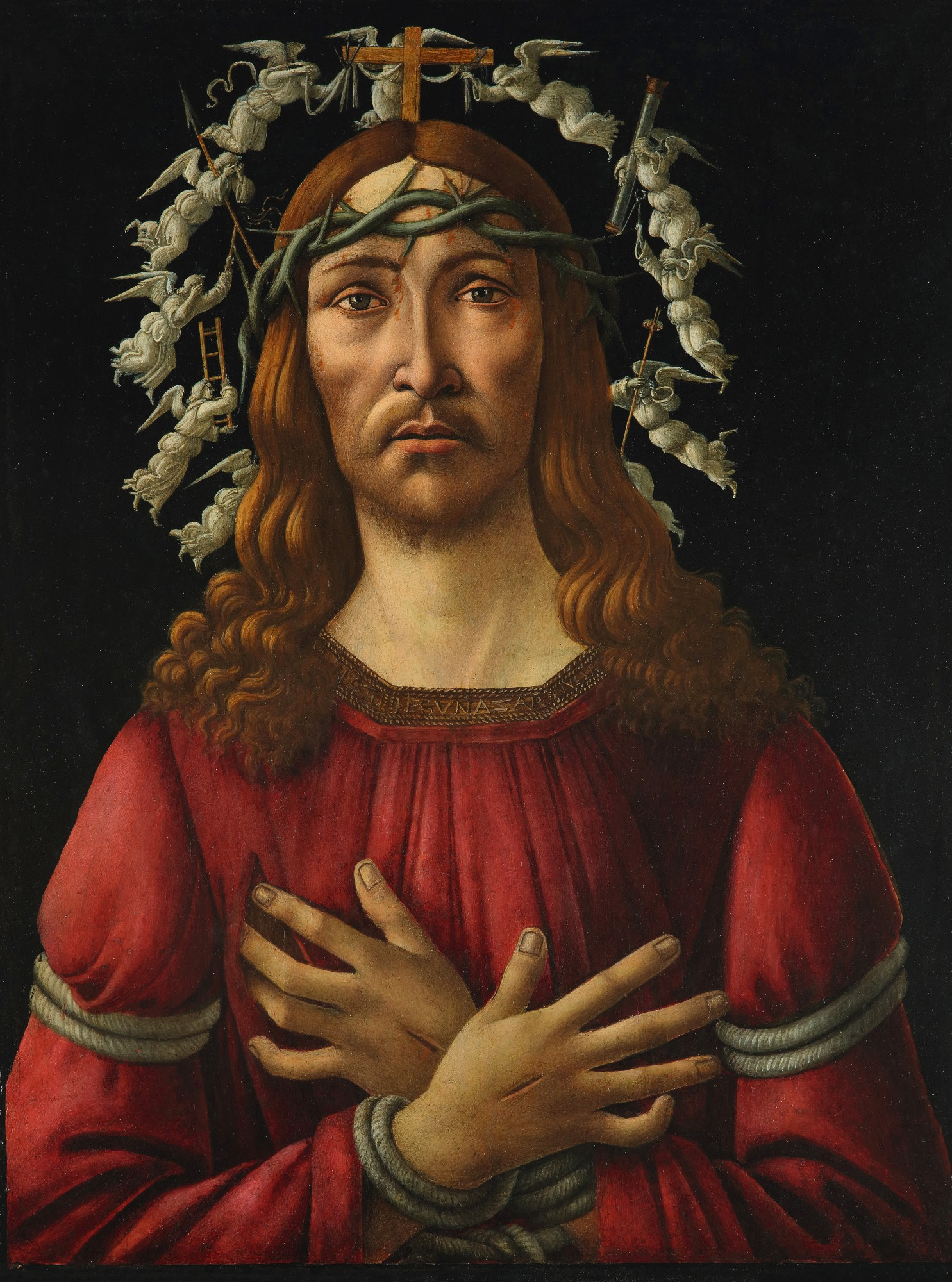
- Artist: Sandro Botticelli
- Year: c. 1500–1510
- Medium: Tempera and oil on panel
- Location: Private collection

The Man of Sorrows is a tempera and oil on panel painting of Jesus Christ by the Florentine artist Sandro Botticelli (1445–1510), thought to have been painted sometime between 1500 and 1510.

The work depicts Jesus in a crown of thorns with his hands and wrists bound by rope. Behind him is a cross symbolizing his crucifixion, as well as was typical in a "Man of Sorrows" painting, a group of angels holding some of the other implements of the Arma Christi or "Instruments of the Passion" which were employed by Jesus to defeat Satan, i.e. the ladder used to take him down from the cross, the Spear of Longinus, which was used to pierce his side during his execution, the pillar to which he was bound while being whipped, the nails used to fasten him to the cross, the pincers utilized to extract the nails from the savior, and the sponge the Roman soldiers dipped in vinegar and offered him prior to his perishing.

The painting has been in private collections since the 19th century, when it was owned by the renowned opera singer Adelaide Kemble. Her descendant Pamela Margaret Stanley (later Lady Cunynghame of Milncraig) sold it at auction as by the workshop of Botticelli for £10,000 in 1963.

The painting is from the artist's post-1492 period when he was greatly influenced by the Dominican friar and theocratic dictator of Florence, Girolamo Savonarola.

In 2009 it was reattributed to the master and in 2010 it was shown as part of the exhibition Botticelli: Likeness, Myth, Devotion at the Stadel Museum, in Frankfurt, Germany. During analysis by Sotheby's, a drawing in preparation for a "Madonna and Child" painting was discovered underneath the finished painting on panel and as Botticelli went on to rotate the canvas to create the new work the abandoned work was left upside down.

On January 27, 2022, Man of Sorrows sold for $45.4 million US (with fees) at Sotheby's in New York City, just short of a year after another of the artist's works, Portrait of a Young Man Holding a Roundel, sold for $92.2 million US and set a record for the price paid for a work by the artist.

== See also ==
- List of works by Sandro Botticelli
