= Madonna of the Pomegranate =

Painting by Sandro Botticelli

- Madonna della Melagrana (Italian)
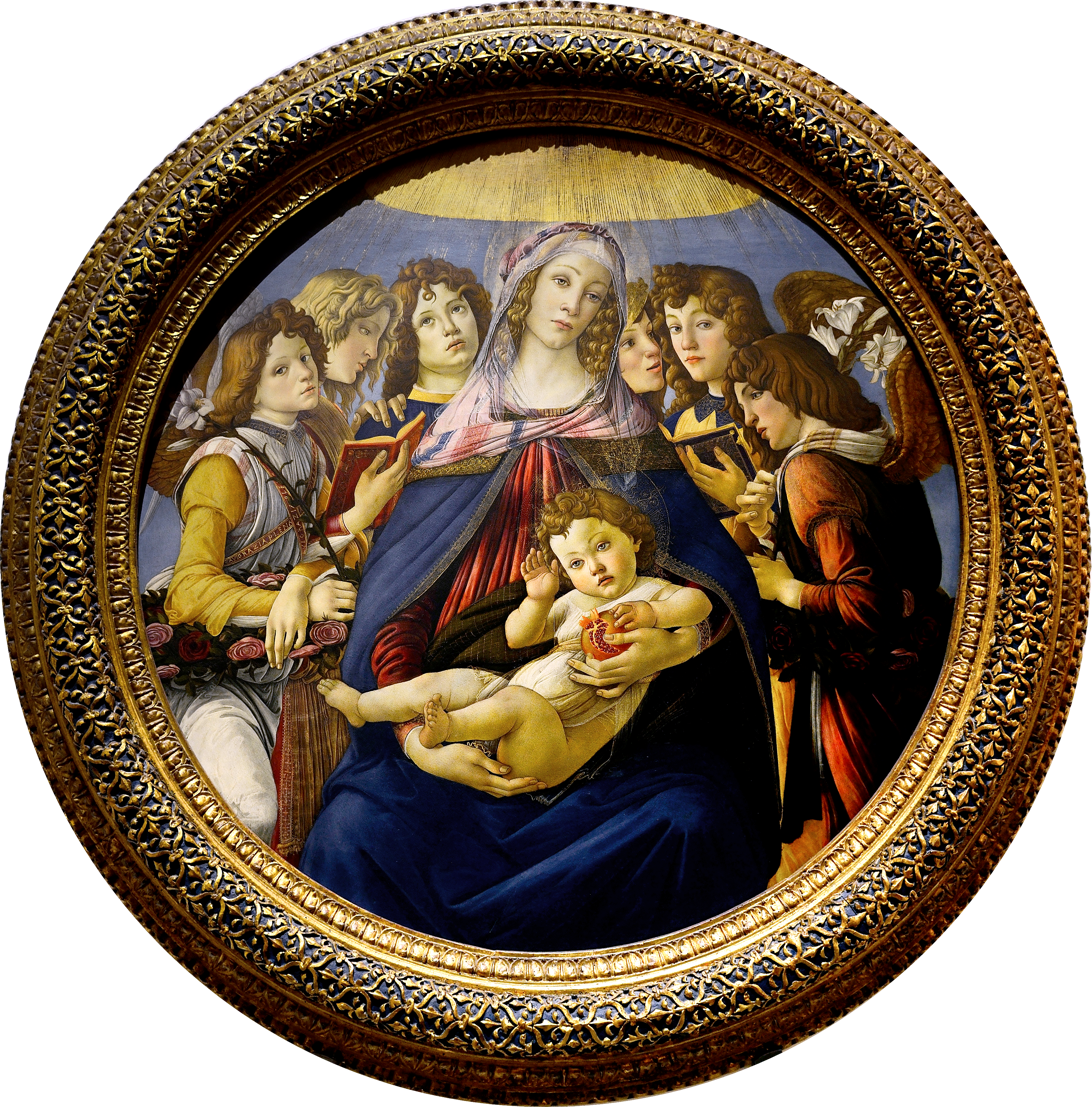
- Artist: Sandro Botticelli
- Year: c. 1487
- Medium: Tempera on panel
- Dimensions: 143.5 cm diameter (56.5 in)
- Location: Uffizi, Florence

The Madonna of the Pomegranate is a tempera on panel painting created circa 1487 by the Italian Renaissance master Sandro Botticelli. It is now in the Uffizi in Florence. Sandro Botticelli was a leading Renaissance artist from Florence, Italy. The Madonna (art) uses the circular format, better known as a tondo, which focuses the attention on the main characters, the Virgin Mary and baby Jesus, who are surrounded symmetrically by angels on each side. Botticelli's use of tempera grassa give the characters a real look, better known as a "naturalistic" style, which is common during the Renaissance. The Virgin Mary is holding baby Jesus gently in her arms while holding a pomegranate in her left hand.

The pomegranate being displayed has a few different interpretations of its meaning in the religious piece. There are many replicas of the Madonna of the Pomegranate made by artists who made copies as part of their artistic training.

A painting by Fra Angelico often given the same title is in the Prado Museum.

== History ==
The Madonna of the Pomegranate is a painting by the Italian Renaissance artist, Alessandro di Mariano di Vanni dei Filipepi (1445–1510), better known as Sandro Botticelli. Botticelli was born and raised in Florence, where he spent a majority of his life as one of the most admired artists of the Florentine Renaissance. In Botticelli's early teenage years, he withdrew from his studies to begin training as an artist. Botticelli began his training under one of the most influential painters in Florence, Fra Filippo Lippi (1406–1469). Lippi was well protected in Florence by the well known, powerful Medici family; he also created works for convents and churches. Lippi was well known for his line clarity and the use of female figures, which is significant because it had a great influence on Botticelli's style. Botticelli was already an established artist during the time of the creation of the Madonna of the Pomegranate. The painting may be commissioned by the Massai di Camera Magistrates, an administrative body of the Florentine Republic, for their Audience Hall. In the 17th century, the painting became part of the collection of Cardinal Leopoldo de' Medici, and has been in the collection of the Uffizi since 1780.

== Description ==
In the painting Madonna of the Pomegranate, Botticelli made it very easy to identify the figures being displayed. In the middle of the painting, Madonna, better known as the Virgin Mary, is surrounded symmetrically by angels with three on each side of her. The angels that are surrounding the Virgin Mary are worshipping her with lilies and garlands of roses. Baby Jesus is lying gently in the Virgin Mary's arms with one hand from both on them on a pomegranate. Both the Virgin Mary and baby Jesus are displaying a sad face. The expression from Our Lady of Sorrows and baby Jesus is intended to remind the viewer of the pain and torture that the Child of God will endure in the future.

== Style ==
The style of this painting is "naturalistic", meaning "life-like", which is commonly seen in Renaissance art. Botticelli draws the viewers attention to the Virgin Mary, Jesus and the pomegranate by the use of vertical lines, portraying a shining heavenly light. The use of a circular format of the painting, known as a tondo, assists to focus the attention on these characters. Botticelli displays the use of symmetry by having an equal amount of angels surrounding the Virgin Mary and Jesus on each side. Botticelli began by establishing figures in a careful, freehand, underdrawing in charcoal on the tempera panel. Botticelli was often willing to adopt recent innovations. The most significant innovation in this work was the use of tempera grassa, a type of paint in which egg yolk was modified with adding oil. This made the paint more transparent, as seen in the Madonna of the Pomegranate. Sandro Botticelli is well known for his brush stroke techniques while painting flesh tones and the pigments he used. Botticelli would often apply pigments in a very thin opaque coat, which are better known as scumbles to artists. Botticelli uses semi-transparent layers of whites, ochres, cinnabars and red lakes which are layered over one another, as seen in the painting. The faces of the women he paints are pale, porcelain-like with vague pink brushes over areas of the cheek, nose and mouth. Botticelli paints infants, such as the Child of God with more intense colors such as cinnabar glazes and accents of red lake. The pigments Botticelli uses have a very cool tone but also has a variety of rich colors mixed. Botticelli enhanced the Virgin Mary and Jesus by the use of brighter colors on their skin tones and clothing while the angels carry a much darker tone.

== Interpretation ==
In the painting, Madonna of the Pomegranate, by Sandro Botticelli, there are a few different interpretations of the meaning of the pomegranate that is held by the Virgin Mary.

=== Cardiac Anatomy ===
The pomegranate in the painting has been identified as an accurate representation of cardiac anatomy. In the late 15th century, Botticelli was introduced to the reappearance of interest in human anatomy and reclamation of the lost medical knowledge from ancient times. Renaissance artists were able to reclaim this lost knowledge through the dissection of corpses. During the time of the Renaissance, artists found it very valuable to become anatomists, which led them to a better understanding of the human body which would improve their artwork to be more life like. The title of the painting, Madonna of the Pomegranate, derives from the fruit being held in the Virgin Mary's hand. The pomegranate serves as a symbol of fullness of Jesus' suffering and resurrection. In the Christian religion, pomegranates symbolize the transition from life to death and resurrection as it eventually will be born again from the seeds that are left behind. The red seeds displayed in the opened pomegranate are meant to remind the viewer of the bloodshed by Jesus, which saved humankind. The peeled portion of the pomegranate demonstrates non-symmetrical chambers, similar to the cardiac chambers of a heart. Botticelli displays the inner spongy membrane, splitting the arils (seed pods) into five spaces. These spaces represent the atria, ventricles, and the main pulmonary trunk. The crown is separated into two parts, imitating the superior vena cava and the arch of aorta with its 3 branches. The fruit is also being held in front of the left side of the chest, which overlays the position of the heart. These surprising analogies with actual cardiac anatomy and its depiction over the chest make likely the hypothesis of a heart hidden in the fruit held by Mary and Jesus.

=== Virtues of the Virgin Mary ===
Secondly, the inclusion of the pomegranate in the painting helps emphasize the Virgin Mary. Although Jesus is the most important figure in the Christian religion, the Virgin Mary, has a vital role as his mother. The Virgin Mary plays a significant role in Jesus's development as a child by providing both a strong emotional and physical foundation that is supportive of the child's overall growth. As Jesus grows, his mother continues to offer support and provide him with proper nourishment for his growing body. The Virgin Mary's duties as a mother also include, providing protection, teaching necessary skills, rules and values in which Jesus will carry with him for the rest of his life. Because Mary faithfully accepted this special role as the mother to birth and raise the Son of God, she shows that she holds many honorable virtues such as courage, love and utmost faith, as she accepted this tremendous feat from God.

== Copies ==
During the Renaissance period, it was not uncommon for artists to imitate other artists' work. The practice of copying was important to artistic training, and there are many replicas of the Madonna of the Pomegranate. After years of removing yellow varnish from what was thought to be an inferior copy of Sandro Botticelli's work, Rachel Turnbull, a senior collections conservator from the English Heritage, discovered the piece was in fact an original copy from Sandro Botticelli's Florence studio. Turnbull and her team removed paint which had been painted over the original copy to make it look more up to date. Tests of the underlying paint indicated that it was of the Renaissance time period. The experts from English Heritage in London were also able determine from the style of painting and brush strokes used, that the painting in their workshop was indeed an original of Sandro Botticelli's Florence studio.

== See also ==
- List of works by Sandro Botticelli
