= Mystic Crucifixion =

Painting by Sandro Botticelli

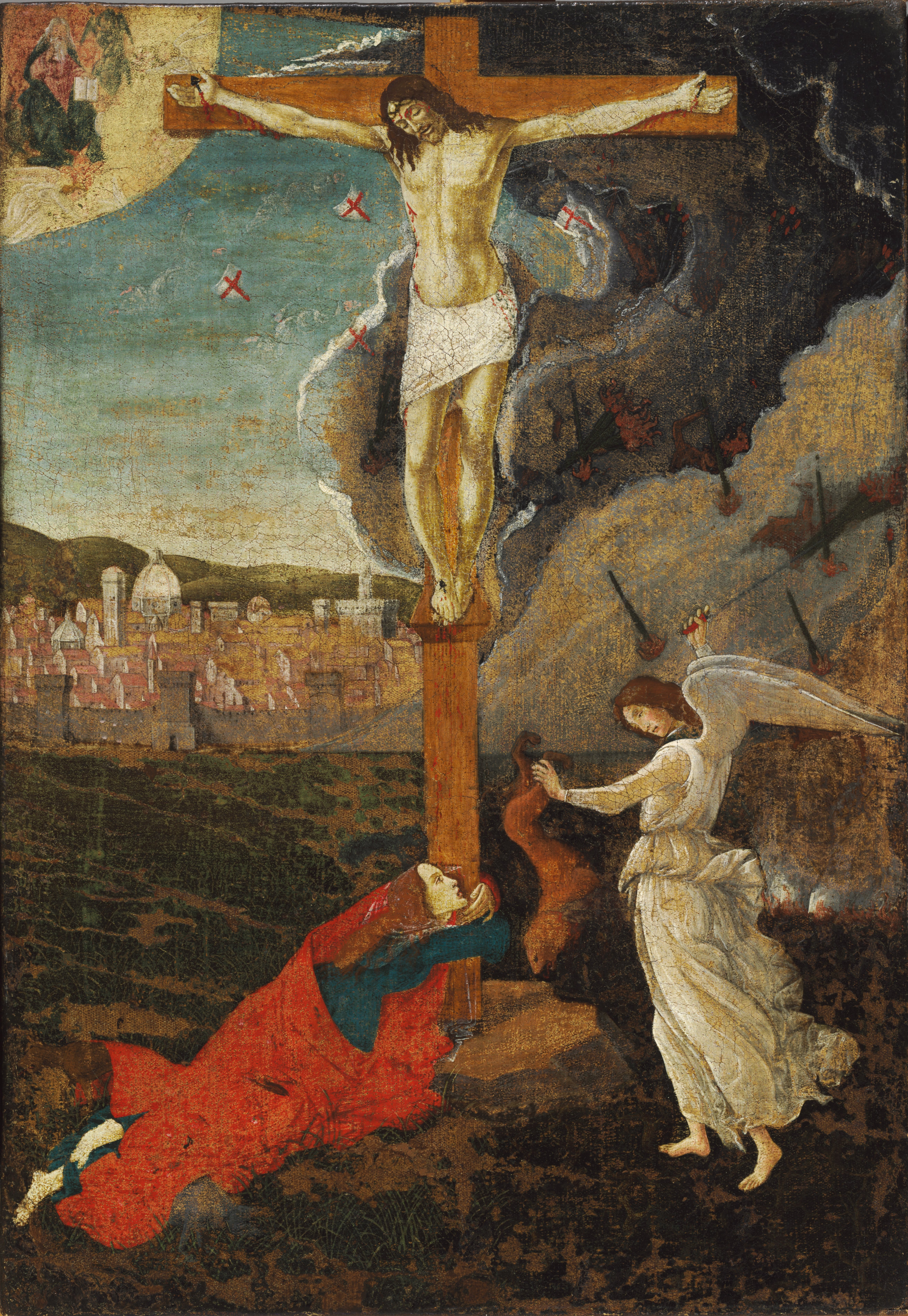
- Artist: Sandro Botticelli
- Year: c. 1500
- Medium: Tempera and oil on canvas
- Location: Fogg Art Museum; Cambridge, Massachusetts

Mystic Crucifixion is a c. 1500 oil on canvas and egg tempera painting by the Florentine Renaissance master Sandro Botticelli (c. 1445-1510) . Painted during the part of his career when he came under the influence of the Dominican friar Girolamo Savonarola (though after the cleric had already been burnt at the stake), the work has been seen as a statement upon the state of Florence itself.

Here Botticelli depicts themes from the cleric's fiery missives. Therein "Firebrands and weapons rain down from black storm clouds, and an angel of justice raises his sword to slay the marzocco, the small lion that is the emblem of Florence". A woman believed to be Mary Magdalene lies on the ground and wrapped around the cross, figuratively at Jesus Christ's feet. The shields of the angels in the picture bear red crosses, the symbol of the people of Florence. The city of Florence can be seen beyond, behind the crucifixion scene in the background.

The work is held in the permanent collection of the Fogg Art Museum at Harvard University.
