= Portrait of a Young Man (Botticelli, Washington) =

Painting by Sandro Botticelli

- Portrait of a Youth
- Artist: Sandro Botticelli
- Year: c. 1483
- Dimensions: 43.5 cm (17.1 in) × 46.2 cm (18.2 in)
- Location: National Gallery of Art
- Accession: 1937.1.19

Portrait of a Young Man or Portrait of a Youth, a portrait attributed to Sandro Botticelli (1446–1510), is an example of Italian Renaissance painting. It was painted in the early (c. 1482/1485) or late (c. 1489–1490) 1480s with tempera on panel and is now housed in the National Gallery of Art in Washington, D.C. The painting was attributed to Botticelli by art historian Bernard Berenson in 1922. Features of this piece include his interesting expression and elegant hand gesture, which some have interpreted as an early depiction of juvenile arthritis or Marfan syndrome.

== See also ==
- List of works by Sandro Botticelli
