= The Daphnephoria (Leighton) =

Painting by Frederic Leighton

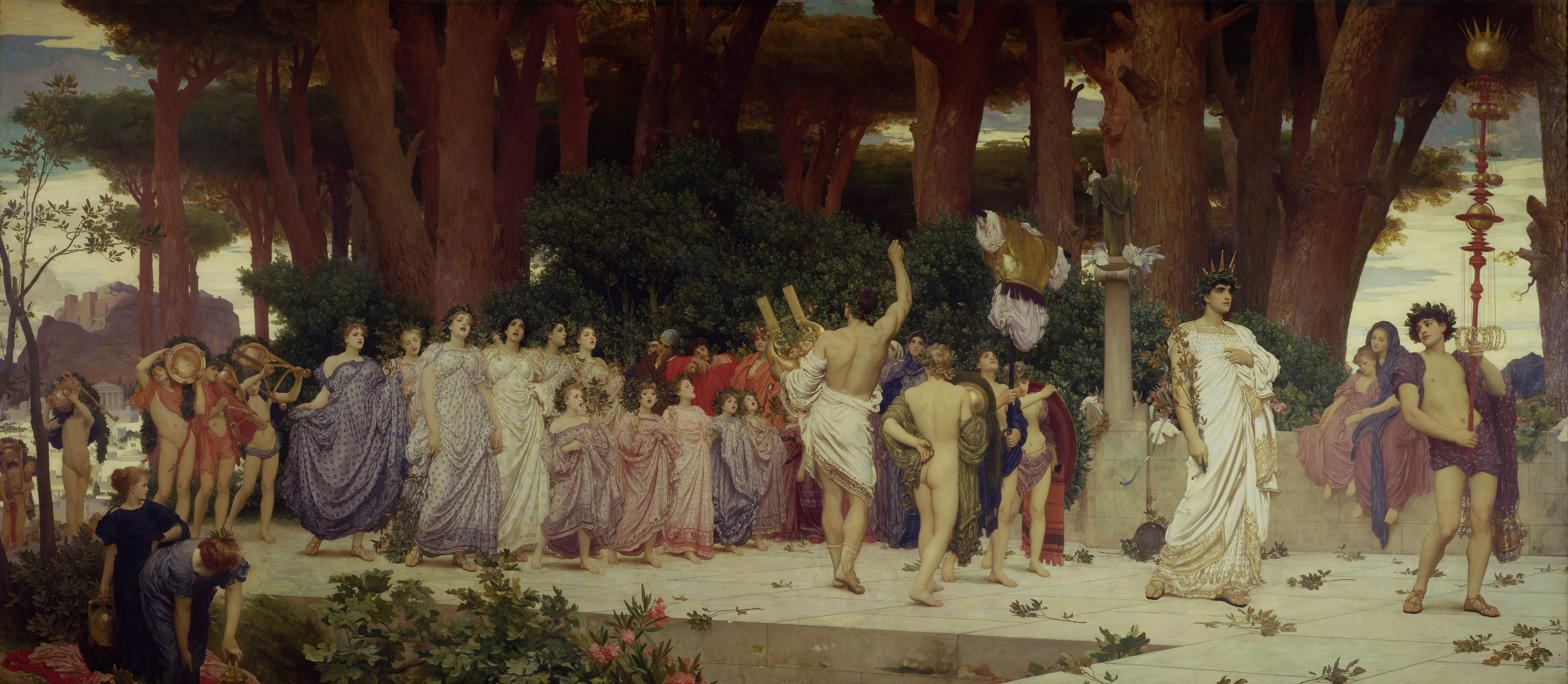
- Artist: Frederic Leighton
- Year: 1876
- Medium: Oil on canvas
- Dimensions: 226 cm × 518 cm (89 in × 204 in)
- Location: Lady Lever Art Gallery
- Accession: LL 3632

The Daphnephoria is an oil painting by Frederic Leighton, first exhibited in 1876.

== Background ==
The Daphenphoria was a triumphal procession held every ninth year at Thebes in honour of Apollo, to whom the laurel was sacred, and to commemorate also a victory of the Thebans over the Aeolians of Arne.

== History ==
In the Academy exhibition of 1876, with The Daphnephoria, Leighton once more chose a classic theme, for a painting which, by its composition, reminded the critics and lovers of art of the artist's early success with the Cimabue's Madonna, and of his other large processional picture, the Syracusan Bride. The work was painted for Stewart Hodgson. He paid £1,500 for it, and Leighton gave him all the studies he made for it. It was later acquired by Lord Leverhulme, and was transferred from his private collection to the Lady Lever Art Gallery in 1922.

== Description ==
The Daphnephoria is a composition of thirty-six figures.

== Reception ==
Much was said for and also against the artist and his art. The Art Journal, however, was favourable. Later Victorian assessments were generally positive, and Sir W. B. Richmond was even enthusiastic. Edgcumbe Staley considered this to be Leighton's "great masterpiece".

== Gallery ==
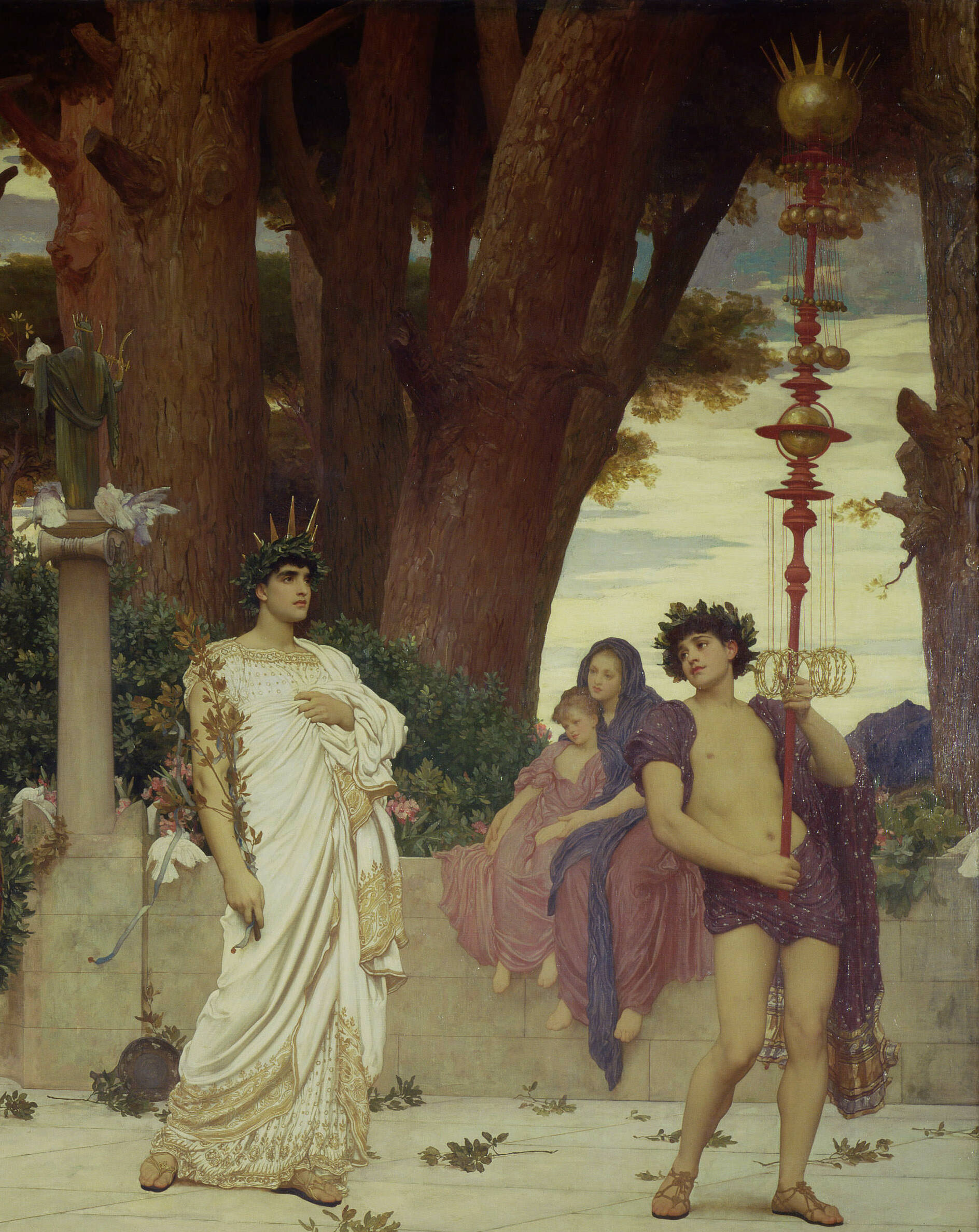
The standard-bearer (right) and the Daphnephoros (left)

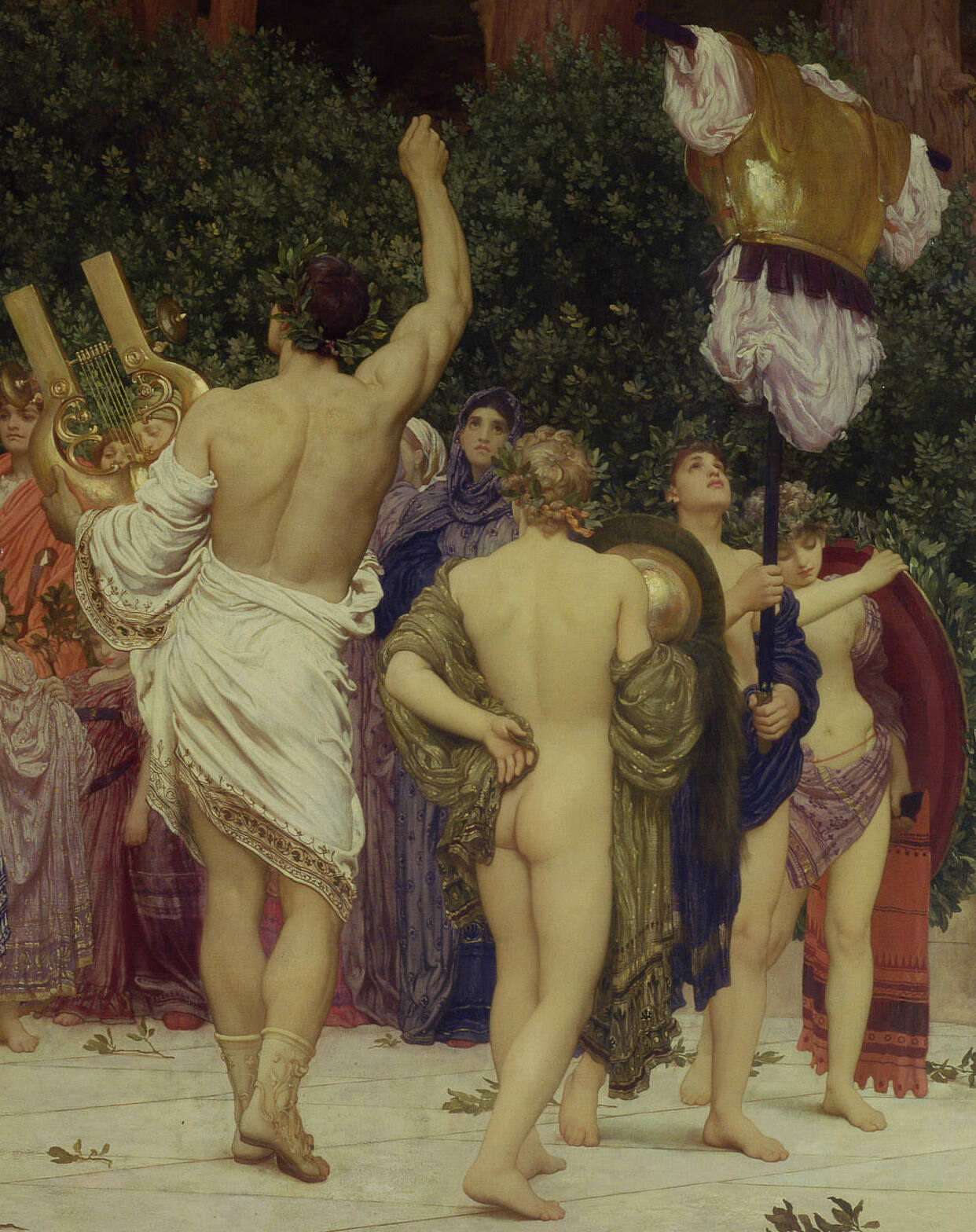
Three youths bearing armour (right) and the Choragos (left)

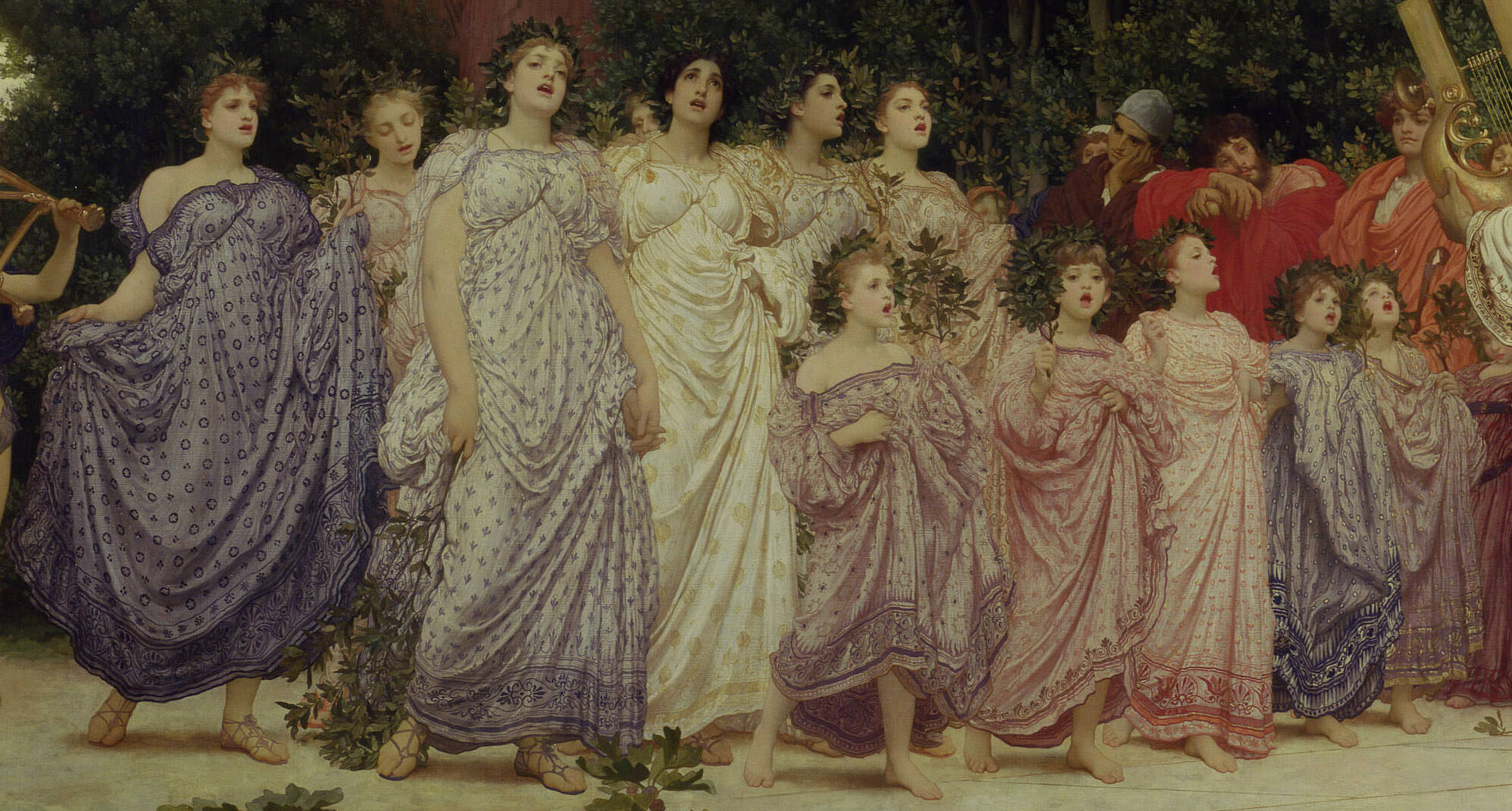
Three rows of maidens (detail)

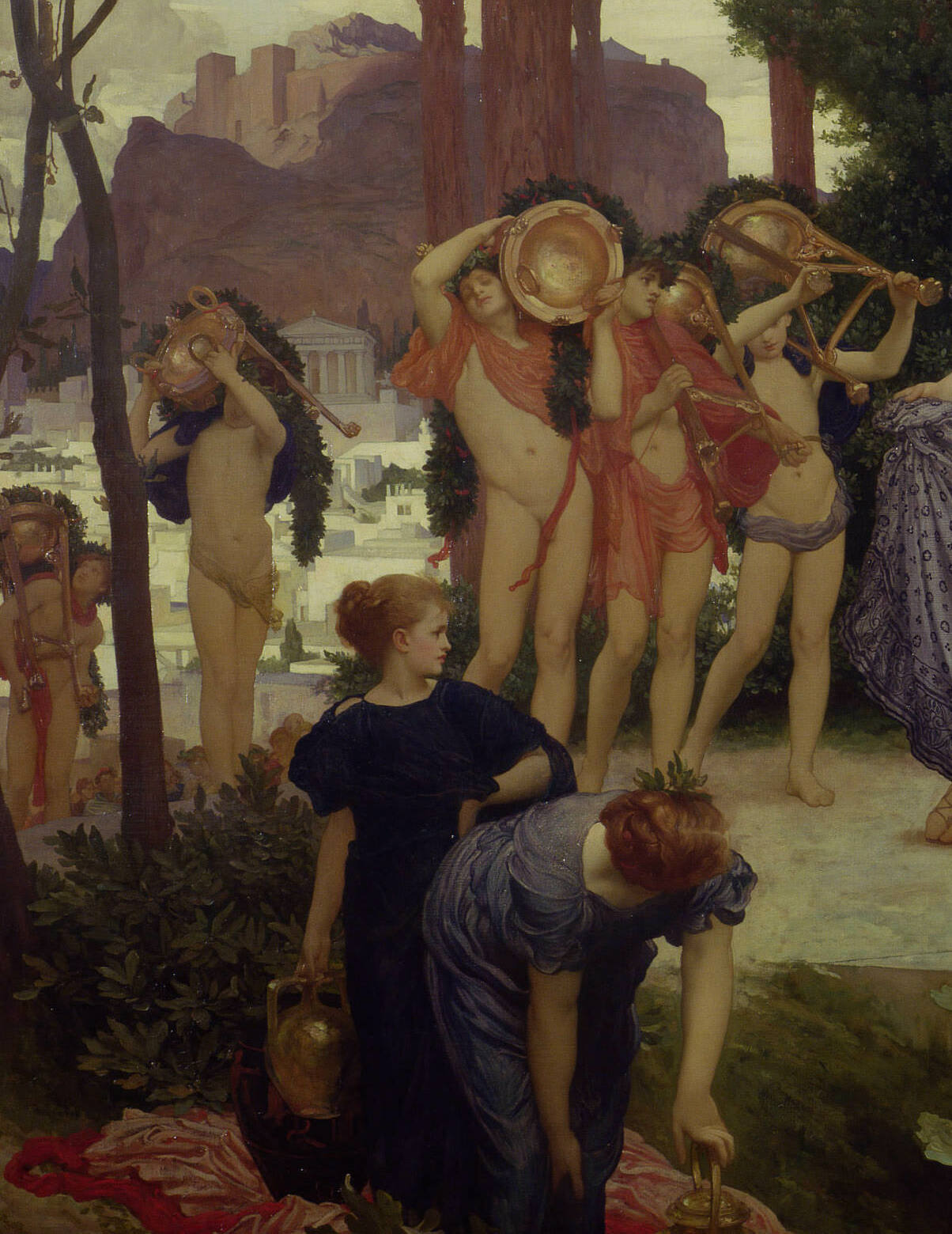
Five boys with tripods (background) and two girls drawing water from a well (foreground)

== Sources ==
- Ash, Russell (1995). Lord Leighton. London: Pavilion Books Limited. pp. 13, 25, 37, 49, plate 17.
- Barrington, Russell (1906). The Life, Letters and Work of Frederic Baron Leighton of Stretton. Vol. 2. London: George Allen, Ruskin House. pp. 29–30, 195–197, 199.
- Jones, Stephen, et al. (1996). Frederic Leighton, 1830–1896. Royal Academy of Arts, London: Harry N. Abrams, Inc. pp. 36–37, 52, 66–67, 82, 84, 88, 95, 107, 146, 176, 177, 180, 182, 194–195, 201, 202, 204, 216, 240. fig. 19, 35, cat. 71.
- Hammerschlag, Keren Rosa (2015). Frederic Leighton: Death, Mortality, Resurrection. United Kingdom: Ashgate. pp. 27–29.
- Rhys, Ernest (1900). Frederic Lord Leighton: An Illustrated Record of his Life and Work. London: George Bell & Sons. pp. 24, 33–35, 47, 68, 111, 126.

Attribution:
