= Actaea, the Nymph of the Shore =

Painting by Frederic Leighton

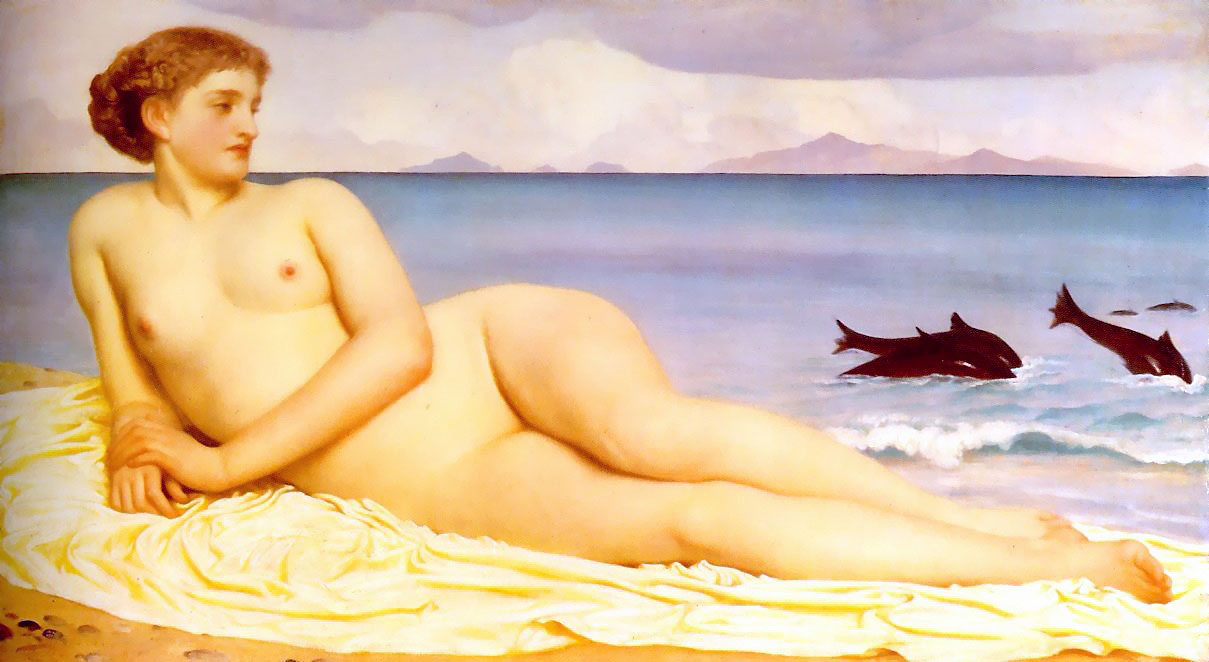
- Artist: Frederic Leighton
- Year: 1868
- Medium: Oil on canvas
- Dimensions: 57.2 cm × 102.2 cm (22.5 in × 40.2 in)
- Location: National Gallery of Canada

Actaea, the Nymph of the Shore is an oil painting by Frederic Leighton, first exhibited in 1868.

== Background ==
Leighton painted his first nudes, Pan and Venus and Cupid, in 1856. They were ambitious works, as by the mid-19th century, nude paintings had largely lost popularity in English art. The next year, the paintings were exhibited at the Manchester Institution, but were met with accusations of impropriety. By the end of the 1850s, Leighton was planning to paint Venus again, but, likely deterred by the criticism of Venus and Cupid, decided not to do so.

Venus Disrobing for the Bath (1866–67) was Leighton's first major classical nude. A deliberate affront to Victorian conservatism, it was controversial and caused a sensation. The 1867 exhibition of George F. Watts' Thetis and Leighton's Venus Disrobing for the Bath initiated the renaissance of nudes in English painting. From this point on, Leighton's work frequently featured nudity and mythological subjects.

In 1867, Leighton visited Greece. While there, he was heavily inspired by Greek art and landscapes, resulting in him renouncing Renaissance art. Leighton felt that Ancient Greek classical art was superior to Renaissance art, which had been a major source of influence for him. After being elected Royal Academician in 1868, Leighton painted Actaea, the Nymph of the Shore and displayed it at the Royal Academy Exhibition of 1868 that same year. The painting's landscape was inspired by one he saw during his trip to Greece.

== Subject ==
Actaea was a Nereid (guardian of the sea) in Greek mythology, one of the 50 daughters of the sea god Nereus. The painting depicts her full-length nude figure lying by the sea shore. Bearing a disdainful expression, she watches her dolphin companions. Her top half is disproportionate to her bottom half, a mistake also evident in Venus Disrobing for the Bath.
