= The Painter's Honeymoon =

Painting by Frederic Leighton

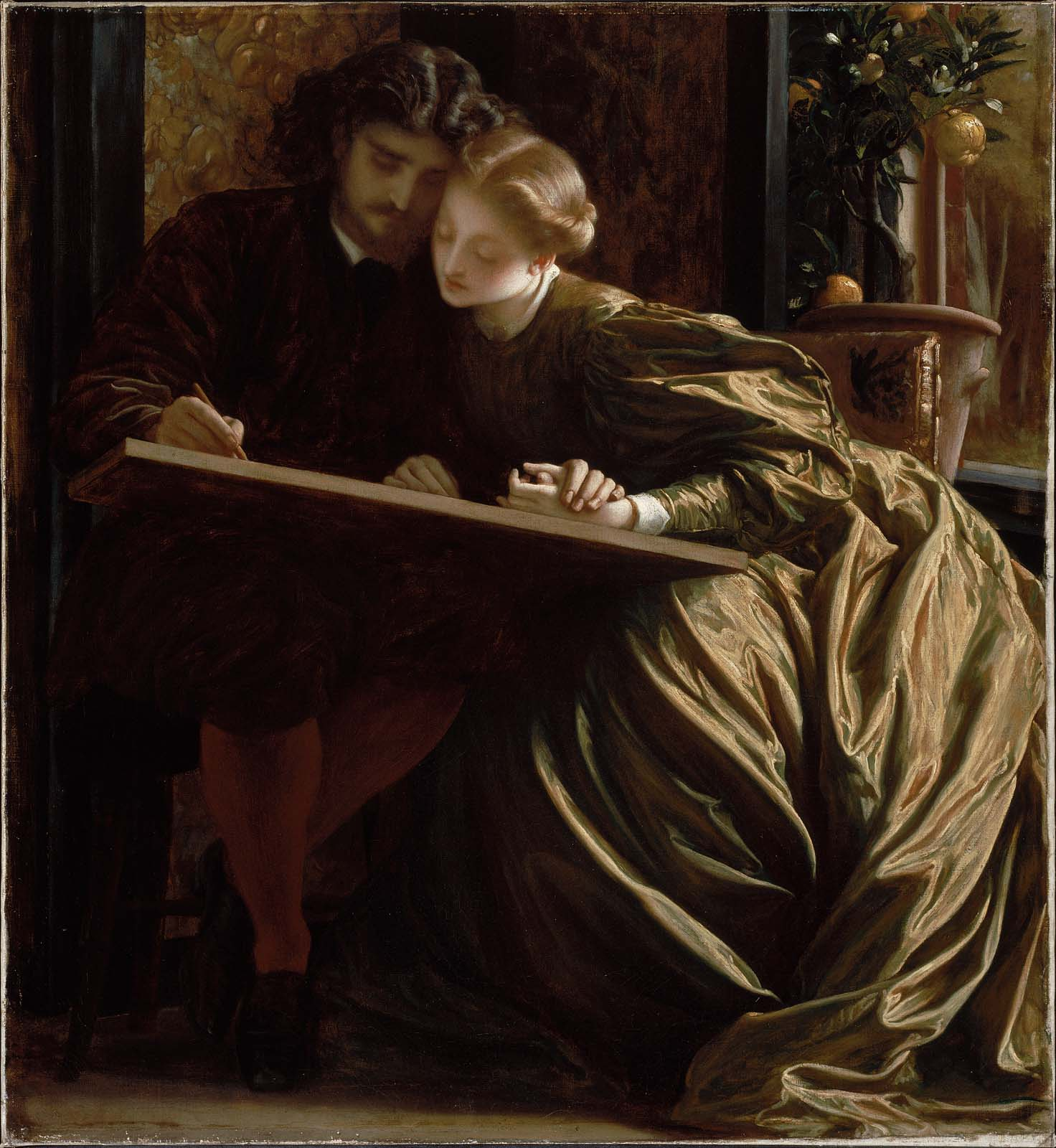
- Artist: Frederic Leighton
- Year: c. 1864
- Medium: oil on canvas
- Dimensions: 83.8 cm × 76.8 cm (33.0 in × 30.2 in)
- Location: Museum of Fine Arts, Boston

The Painter's Honeymoon is an oil painting on canvas by the English painter Frederic Leighton, 1st Baron Leighton, produced c. 1864 and now in the Museum of Fine Arts, Boston.

== History ==
This is an unusual composition for Leighton, who usually veered towards Classical images and, in particular, favored nudes – the latter were so common in his work that many of his pictures had to be removed from the 1857 exhibition of English art that toured America, because they gave offense.

The Italian man who sat for the newly married painter occurs often in Leighton's work: he was apparently one of the artist's favorite models. Importantly, his hands are painted in fine detail, emphasizing how crucial they are to his work. The soft tones and accuracy with which Leighton painted the couple contrasts obviously with the harshness of the orange tree behind them. Leighton appears to have had difficulty in painting it – on close inspection, the oranges look as though they have been enameled. Generally, the composition and glowing color of the picture reflect the influence of such 16th-century Venetian painters as Giorgione and Titian.

The Painter's Honeymoon was first exhibited at the Royal Academy's Summer Exhibition of 1866 – it appears that Leighton deliberately prevented it from being shown publicly in the years following its completion. As Leighton was renowned for his lack of confidence and shyness, many of his contemporaries believed he felt he had betrayed too much of his own emotion to feel comfortable exhibiting the picture.

== Bibliography ==
- Barringer, Tim & Prettejohn, Elizabeth, Frederic Leighton: Antiquity, Renaissance, Modernity (Paul Mellon Center for Studies in British Art), Yale University Press (1999). ISBN 978-0-300-07937-1
- Barrington, Russel, The Life, Letters and Work of Frederic Leighton, 2 Voll., BiblioBazaar (2010). ISBN 978-1-143-23340-1
- Newall, Christopher, The Art of Lord Leighton, Phaidon Press (1993). ISBN 978-0-7148-2957-9
