= Daphnephoria =

Ancient Greek festival

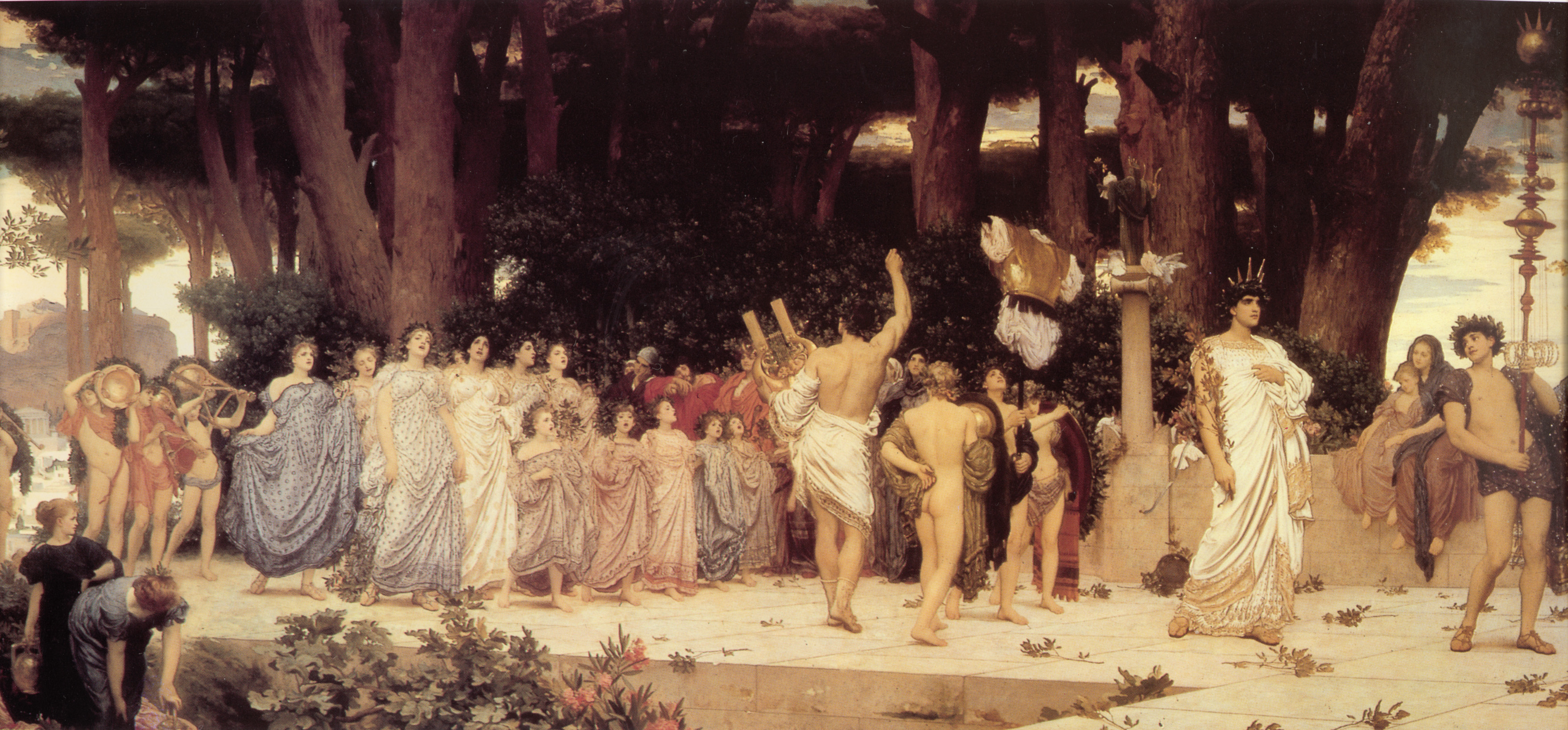
The Daphnephoria, Frederic Leighton (1876)

Daphnephoria was a festival held every ninth year at Thebes in Boeotia in honour of Apollo Ismenius or Galaxius.

== History ==
The Daphnephoria consisted of a procession in which the chief figure was a boy of good family and noble appearance, whose father and mother must be alive. With young participants, the procession was able to combine components together, which signified an important stage or rite of passage. Immediately in front of this boy, who was called the Daphnephoros ('laurel bearer'), walked one of his nearest relatives, carrying an olive branch hung with laurel and flowers and having on the upper end a bronze ball from which hung several smaller balls. Another smaller ball was placed on the middle of the branch or pole (which was called a κώπω), which was then twined round with purple ribbons, and at the lower end with saffron ribbons. These balls were said to indicate the sun, stars and moon, while the ribbons referred to the days of the year, being 365 in number. The Daphnephoros, wearing a golden crown, or a wreath of laurel, richly dressed and partly holding the pole, was followed by a chorus of maidens carrying suppliant branches and singing a hymn to the god.

=== Ancient sources ===
The Daphnephoros dedicated a bronze tripod in the temple of Apollo, and Pausanias (ix. 10.4) mentions the tripod dedicated there by Amphitryon when his son Heracles had been Daphnephoros. The festival is described by Proclus, quoted by Photius in his Bibliotheca, codex 239.
