= Cimabue's Celebrated Madonna =

Painting by Frederic Leighton

- Cimabue's Celebrated Madonna is carried in Procession through the Streets of Florence
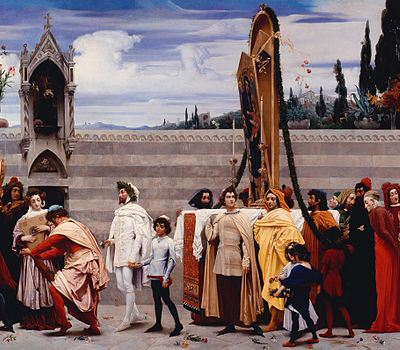
- Detail from Cimabue's Celebrated Madonna. See below for the full image.
- Artist: Frederic Leighton, 1st Baron Leighton
- Year: 1853–1855
- Medium: Oil on canvas
- Dimensions: 222 cm × 521 cm (87 in × 205 in)
- Location: The National Gallery, London

Cimabue's Celebrated Madonna, originally called Cimabue's [Celebrated] Madonna [is] Carried in Procession through the Streets of Florence, is an oil painting by English artist Frederic Leighton. Measuring more than two metres tall and more than five metres wide, the canvas was painted by Leighton from 1853 to 1855 in Rome as his first major work.

Since 1988 the work has been displayed in the National Gallery, London, on long-term loan from the Royal Collection, where it was long hung prominently, high above the main vestibule, directly beyond the entrance to the gallery, but more recently it has been in Room 45. In 2018 it was displayed at the top of the Sainsbury Wing staircase. In 2025 the work is no longer on display.

Leighton House has an oil sketch for the painting, and several preparatory drawings.

== Description ==
The picture shows a scene from the 16th century art historian Giorgio Vasari's description of the 13th century procession of an altarpiece of the Madonna and Child through the streets of Florence. The Madonna is being carried from the studio of the Florentine artist Cimabue to the church of Santa Maria Novella. Cimabue himself is depicted immediately in front of the Madonna wearing a laurel wreath upon his head. He is followed by a group including several leading Florentine artistic figures of the day, including his pupil Giotto, the poet Dante Alighieri (leaning on the wall at right), the architect Arnolfo di Cambio, (Note: "Arnolfo di Lapo" was the name given by Vasari for Arnolfo di Cambio, and was named as "di Lapo" in the original exhibition catalog.) the painters Gaddo Gaddi, Andrea Tafi, Buonamico Buffalmacco and Simone Memmi; the sculptor Nicola Pisano, and on horseback at the right edge of the image, the King of Naples, Charles of Anjou.

The Madonna depicted, seen at a very narrow angle in the centre of the painting, is actually not by Cimabue, but instead it is the Rucellai Madonna by Sienese artist Duccio di Buoninsegna. This error is the result of the misattribution of this altarpiece by Vasari which lasted into Leighton's time, an error which was not corrected until 1889 by Franz Wickhoff. Both the Rucellai Madonna and a similar work that is correctly attributed to Cimabue, the Santa Trinita Maestà, are displayed at the Uffizi Gallery in Florence.

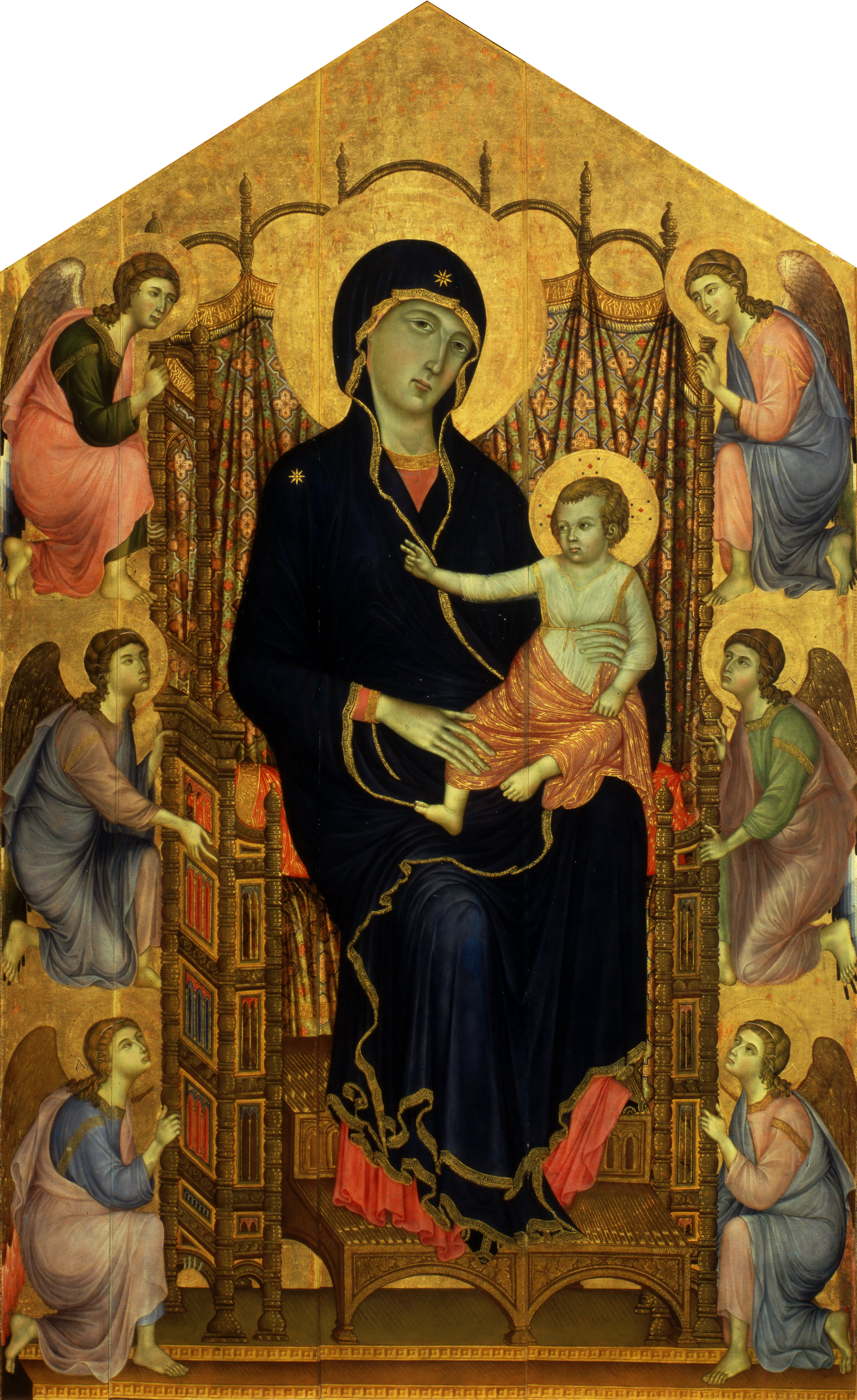
The Rucellai Madonna by Duccio di Buoninsegna

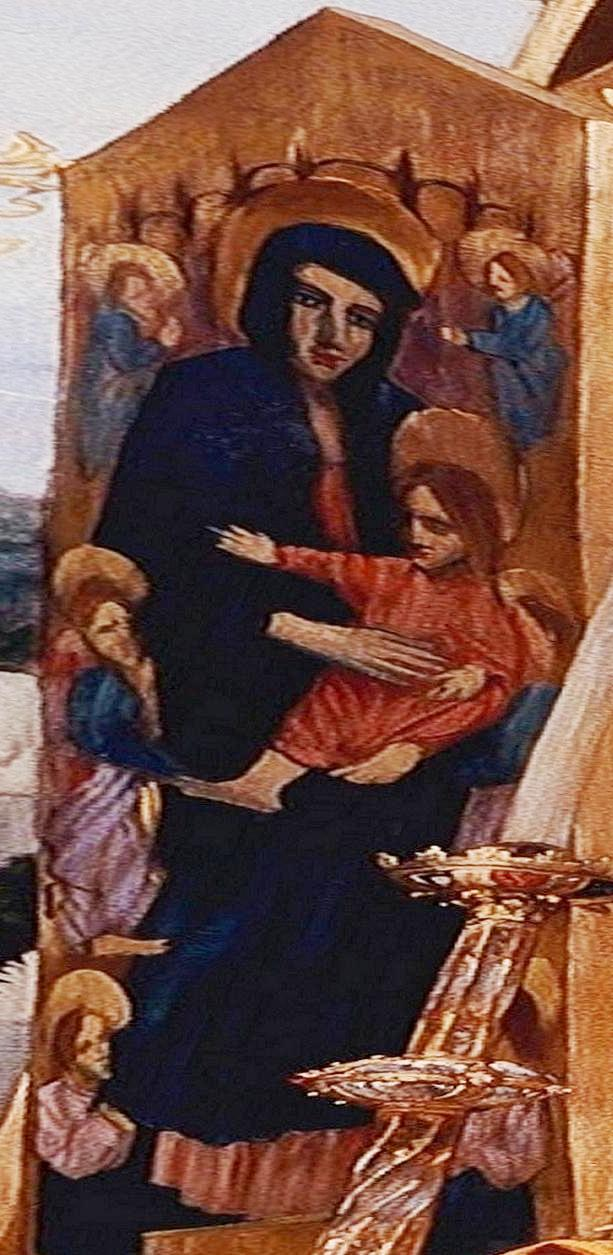
Detail from Leighton's painting, rectified projection of the Madonna

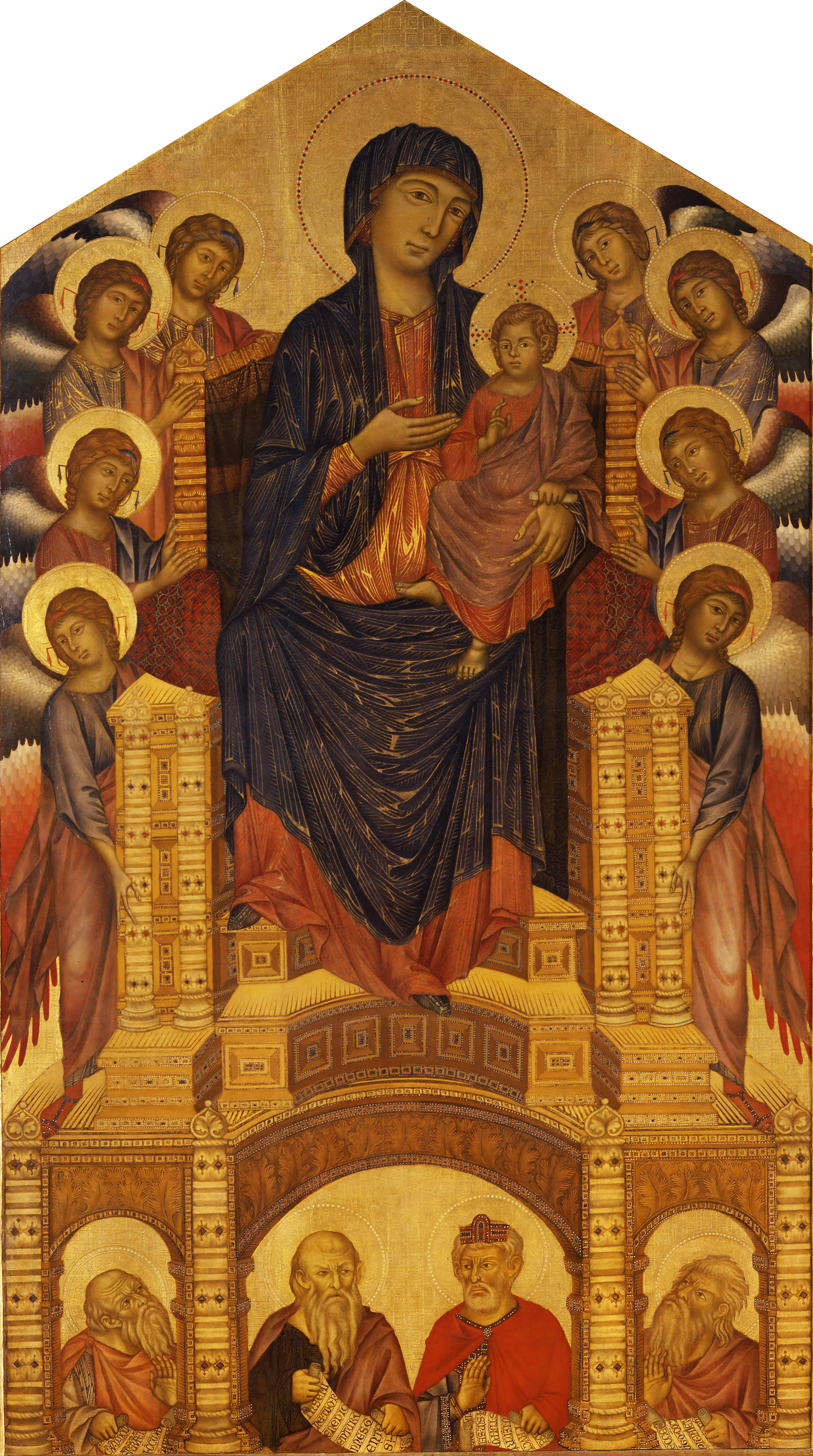
The Santa Trinita Maestà by Cimabue

== Reception ==
The painting was an immediate success for Leighton when he presented it at the 1855 summer exhibition of the Royal Academy of Arts in London where it received near-universal acclaim. Queen Victoria purchased it on the first day of the exhibition for 600 guineas. The National Gallery notes Victoria's diary entry about the painting: "There was a very big picture by a man called Leighton. It is a beautiful painting, quite reminding one of a Paul Veronese, so bright and full of light. Albert was enchanted with it—so much so that he made me buy it." The English artist Dante Gabriel Rossetti wrote that the work proved Leighton's "great power of rich arrangement." His brother, the art critic and writer William Rossetti, was not as enchanted: "His picture has largeness, but not greatness; style, but not intensity; design rather than thought; arrangement rather than conception: it is individual, not specially original."

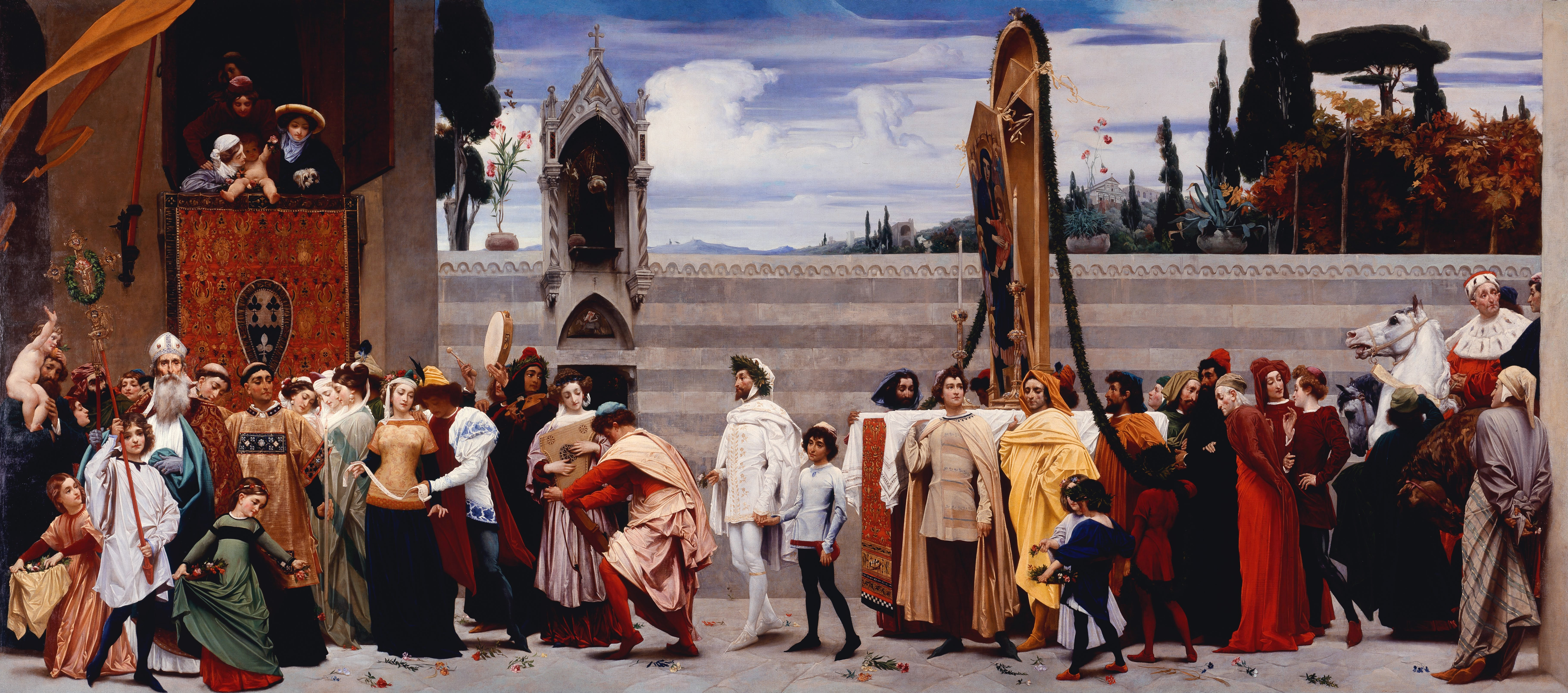
Panoramic display of Cimabue's Celebrated Madonna.
