= Frederic Leighton =

English painter and sculptor (1830–1896)

The Right Honourable The Lord Leighton PRA
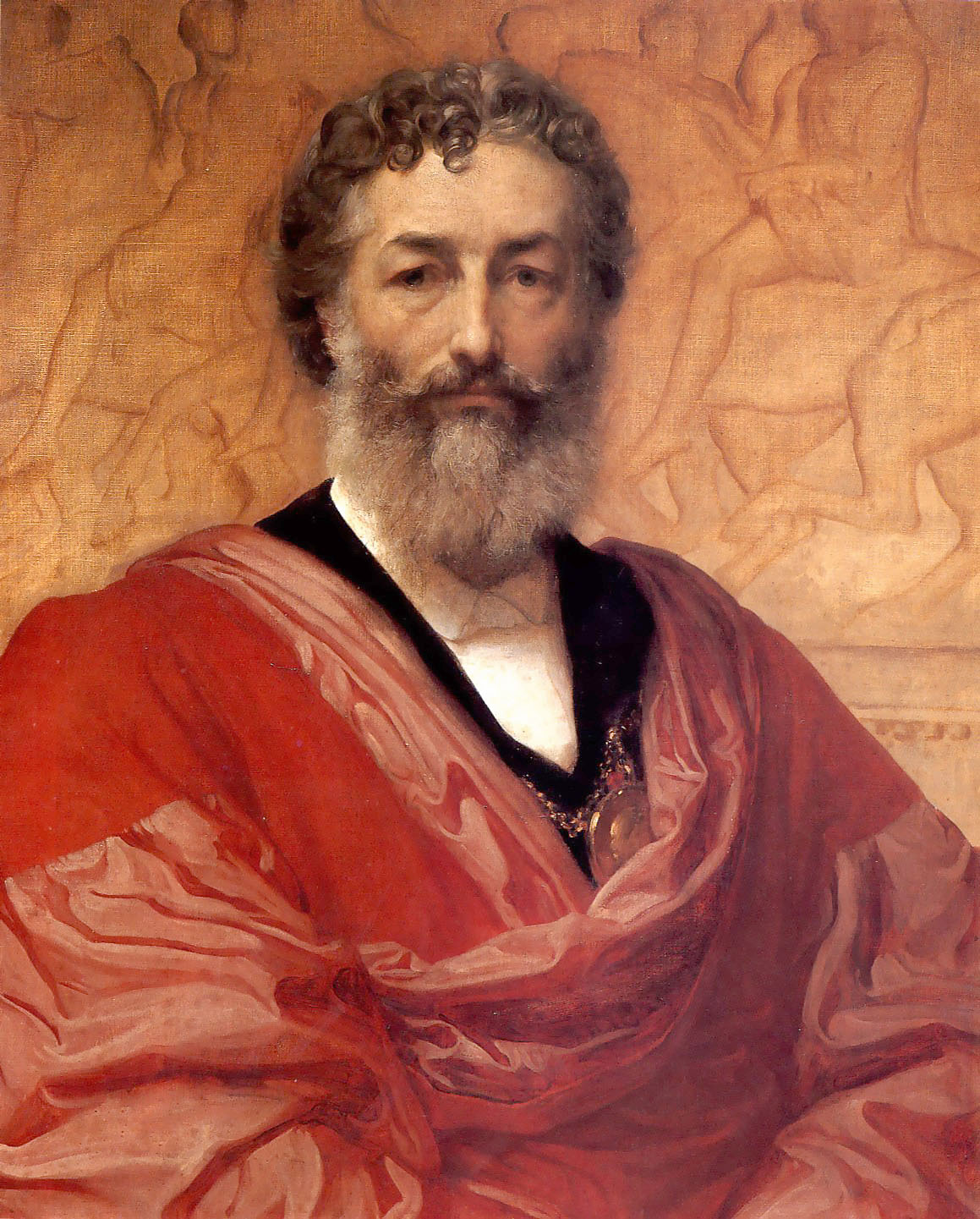
- Frederic Leighton, Self-portrait, 1880
- Born: Frederic Leighton; 3 December 1830; Scarborough, North Riding of Yorkshire, England
- Died: 25 January 1896 (aged 65); Kensington, London, England
- Education: Eduard von Steinle; Giovanni Costa
- Known for: Painting and sculpture
- Notable work: Flaming June
- Movement: Academicism, Pre-Raphaelite and British Aestheticism
- Awards: Prix de Rome; Légion d'honneur

Signature
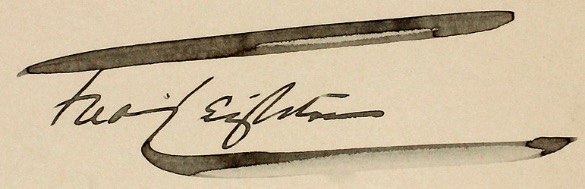

Frederic Leighton, 1st Baron Leighton, PRA (3 December 1830 – 25 January 1896), known as Sir Frederic Leighton between 1878 and 1896, was a British Victorian painter, draughtsman, and sculptor. His works depicted historical, biblical, and classical subject matter in an academic style. His paintings were enormously popular and expensive, during his lifetime, but fell out of critical favour for many decades in the early 20th century.

Leighton was the bearer of the shortest-lived peerage in history; after only one day, his hereditary peerage became extinct upon his death.

== Biography ==
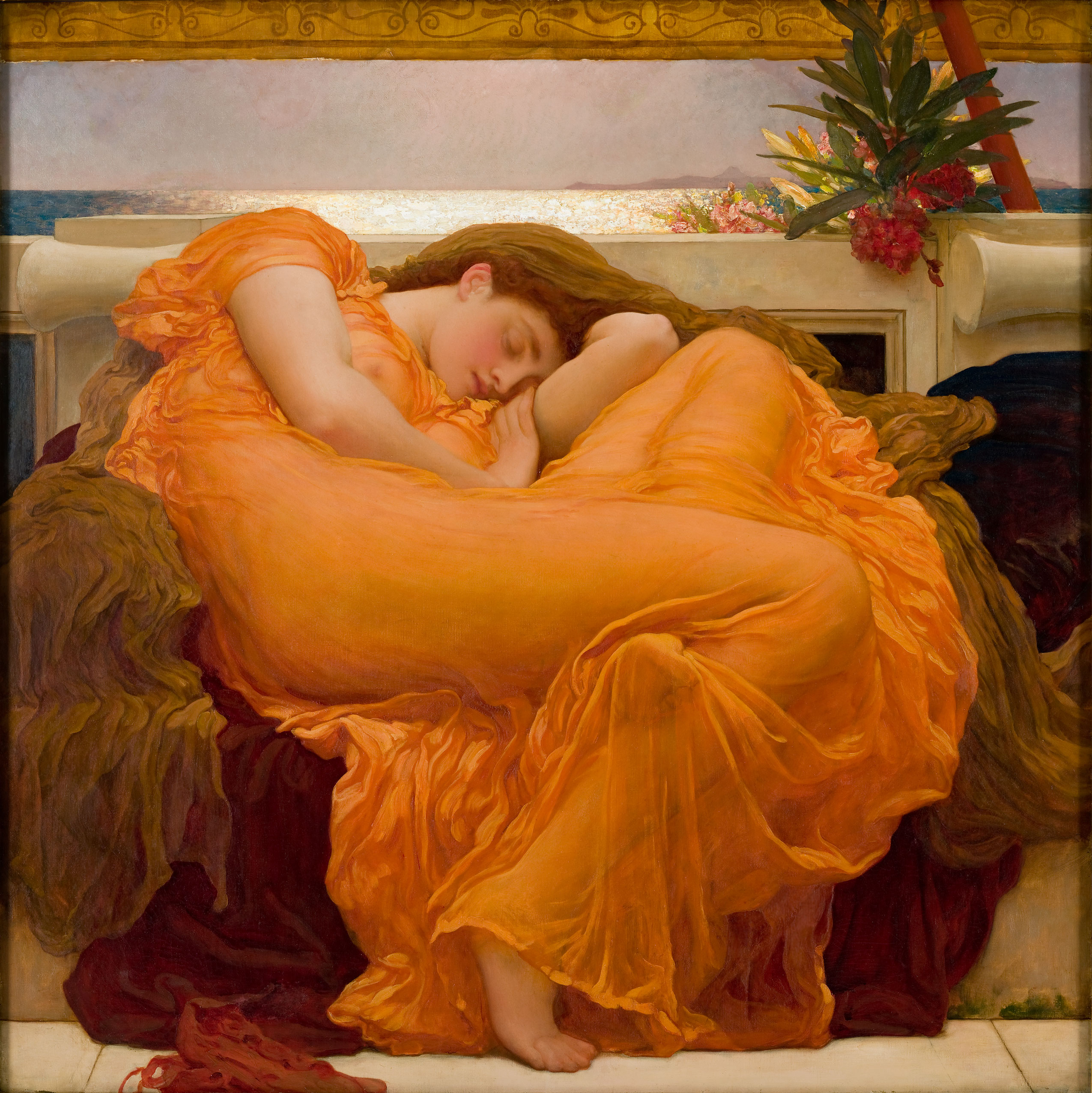
Flaming June (1895; Museo de Arte de Ponce)

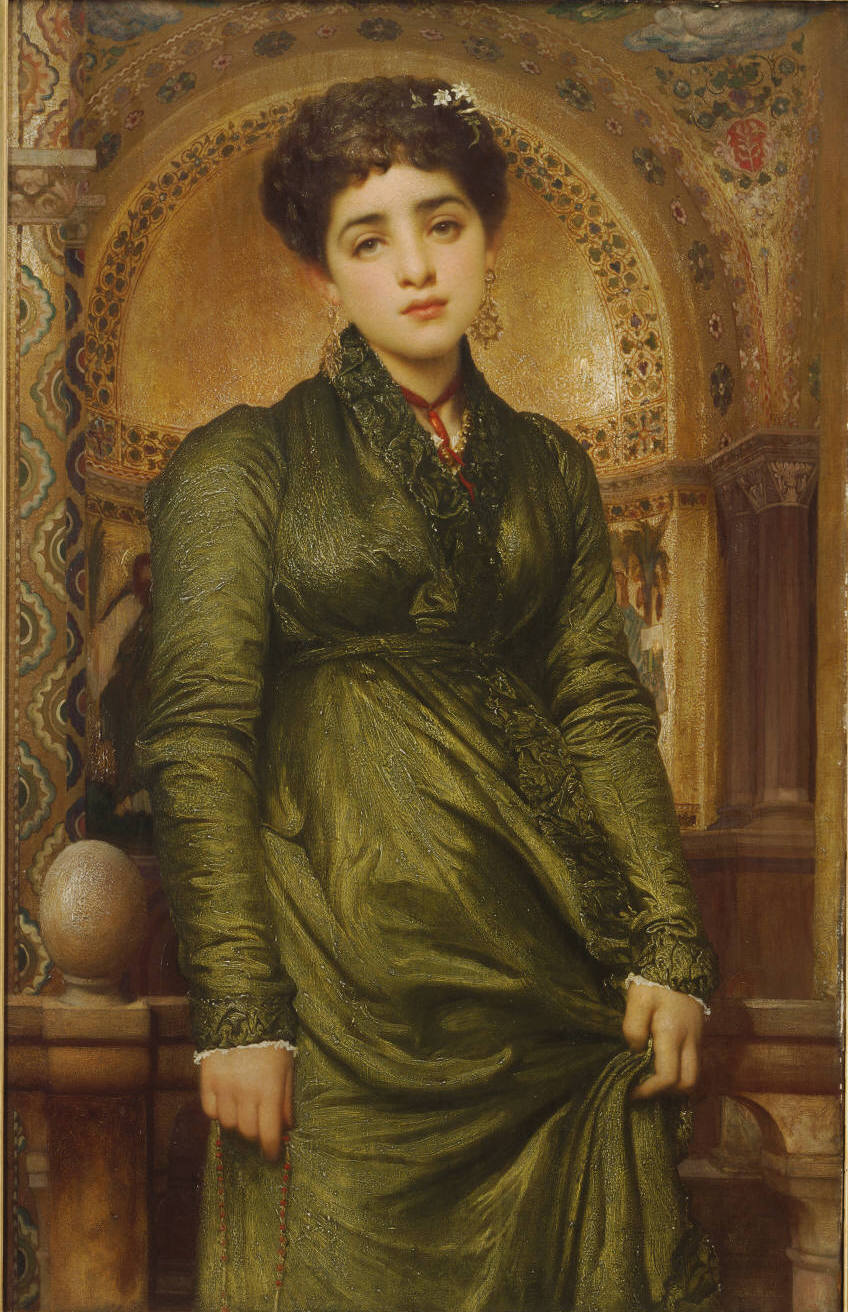
After Vespers (1871; Princeton University Art Museum)

Leighton was born in Scarborough to Augusta Susan and Dr Frederic Septimus Leighton (1799–1892), a medical doctor. Leighton's grandfather, Sir James Boniface Leighton (1769–1843), had been the primary physician to two Russian tsars—Alexander I and Nicholas I—and their families, and amassed a fortune while in their service. Leighton's career was always cushioned by this family wealth, with his father paying him an allowance throughout his life. He had two sisters; one of them, Alexandra, was Robert Browning's biographer. He was educated at University College School, London. He then received his artistic training on the European continent, first from Eduard von Steinle and then from Giovanni Costa. At age 17, in the summer of 1847, he met the philosopher Arthur Schopenhauer in Frankfurt and drew his portrait, in graphite and gouache on paper—the only known full-length study of Schopenhauer done from life. When he was 24 he was in Florence; he studied at the Accademia di Belle Arti, and painted the procession of the Cimabue Madonna through the Borgo Allegri. From 1855 to 1859 he lived in Paris, where he met Ingres, Delacroix, Corot, and Millet.

Travel was an important part of Leighton's life from childhood. By his late teens, he was living with his family in Frankfurt, Germany and had already visited many of Europe's major cities, including Florence and Rome, places which he would return to on a great many occasions over the next decades. By his late twenties, extended periods had been spent living in Rome, where he became close friends with Richard Buckner, and then Paris and Leighton had made his first trip outside Europe, travelling to north Africa in 1857. Once settled in London, he continued to make extensive trips every year until shortly before his death. The countries that Leighton visited on at least one occasion include Austria, Algeria, Egypt, France, Germany, Greece, Ireland, Italy, Lebanon, Morocco, The Netherlands, Scotland, Spain, Switzerland, Syria, and Turkey.

In 1860, he moved to London, where he associated with the Pre-Raphaelites. He designed Elizabeth Barrett Browning's tomb for Robert Browning in the English Cemetery, Florence in 1861. In 1864 he became an associate of the Royal Academy and in 1878 he became its President (1878–96). His 1877 sculpture, Athlete Wrestling with a Python, was considered at its time to inaugurate a renaissance in contemporary British sculpture, referred to as the New Sculpture. American art critic Earl Shinn claimed at the time that "Except Leighton, there is scarce any one capable of putting up a correct frescoed figure in the archway of the Kensington Museum." His paintings represented Britain at the great 1900 Paris Exhibition.

He was the first President of the Committee commissioning the Survey of London which documented the capital's principal buildings and public art.

Leighton remained a bachelor; rumours of his having an illegitimate child with one of his models, and that he was homosexual, continue to be debated. He certainly enjoyed an intense and romantically tinged relationship with the poet Henry William Greville whom he met in Florence in 1856. The older man showered Leighton with letters, but the romantic affection seems not to have been reciprocated. Enquiry is further hindered by Leighton leaving no diaries, and his letters lack reference to his personal circumstances. No definite primary evidence has yet come to light that effectively dispels the secrecy that Leighton built up around himself, although it is clear that he did court a circle of younger men around his artistic studio.

Leighton was knighted at Windsor Castle in 1878, and was created a baronet in 1886. In the 1896 New Year Honours he became the first painter to be given a peerage. The patent creating him Baron Leighton of Stretton, in the County of Shropshire, was issued on 24 January 1896; He died the next day of angina pectoris. On his death his hereditary peerage was extinguished after existing for only a day; this is a record in the peerage.

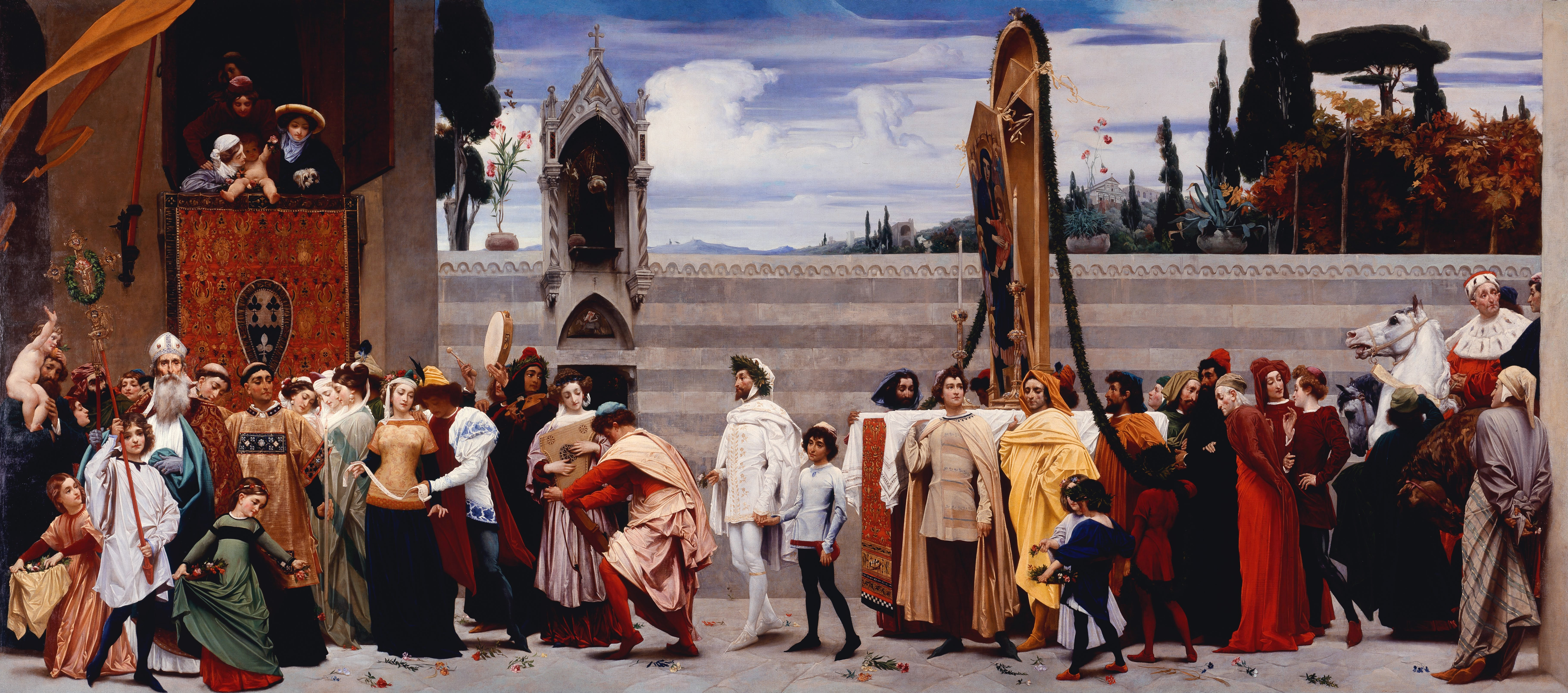
Cimabue's Celebrated Madonna Is Carried in Procession Through the Streets of Florence, 1853–1855

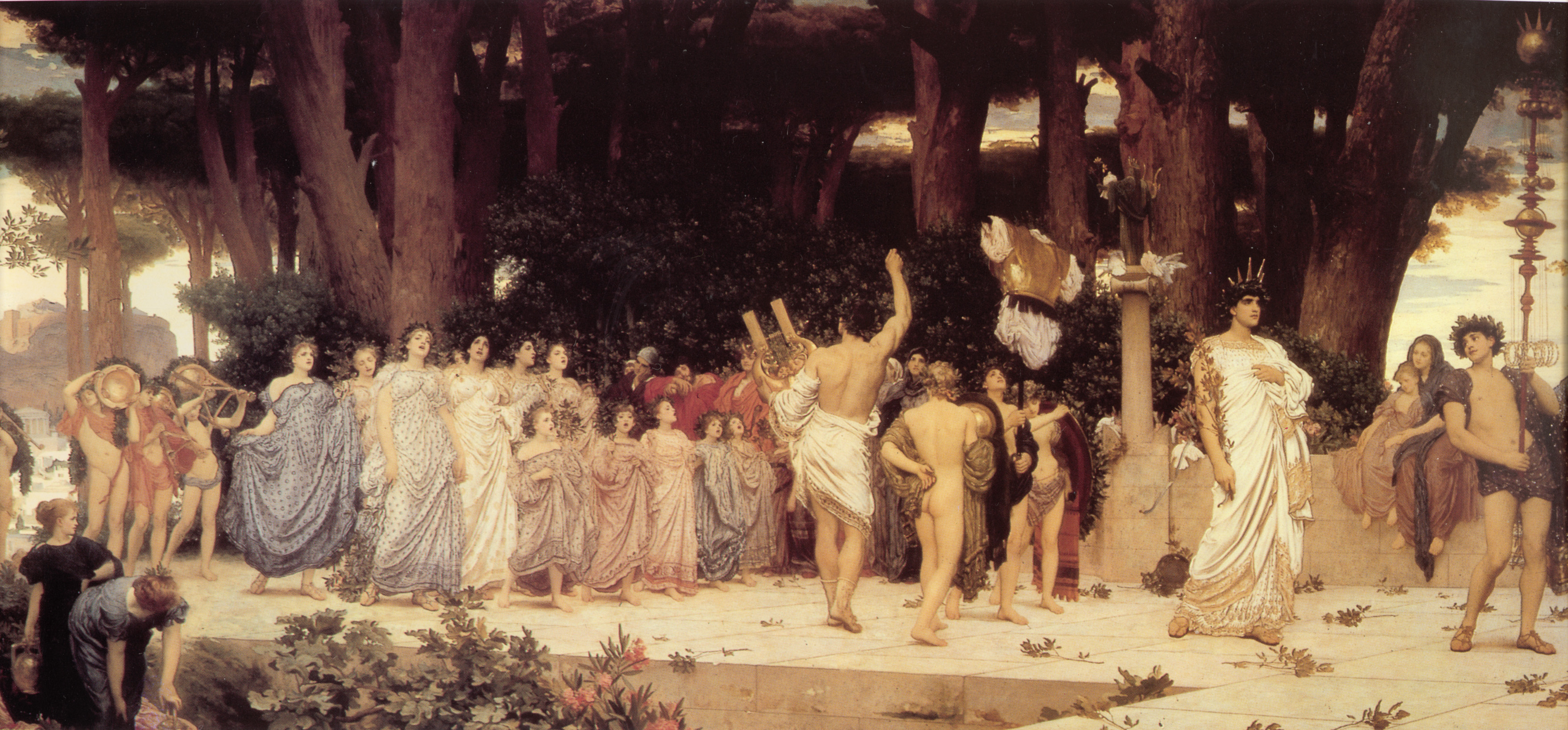
Daphnephoria, oil on canvas painting, 1874–1876, Lady Lever Art Gallery

His former home in Holland Park, London, Leighton House, is open to the public. It contains many of his drawings and paintings, as well as some of his former art collection, including works by Old Masters and his contemporaries, such as a painting dedicated to Leighton by Sir John Everett Millais. The house also houses many of Leighton's inspirations, including his collection of Iznik tiles. Its centrepiece is the magnificent Arab Hall, which is featured in issue ten of Cornucopia. A blue plaque commemorates Leighton at Leighton House.

== Artists Rifles ==
Leighton was an enthusiastic volunteer soldier, enrolling with the first group to join the 38th Middlesex (Artists') Rifle Volunteer Corps (later to be known as the Artists Rifles) on 5 October 1860.

His qualities of leadership were immediately identified, and he was promoted to command a Company within a few months. On 6 January 1869 Captain Leighton was elected to command the Artists Rifles by a general meeting of the corps. In the same year he was promoted to major and in 1875 to lieutenant colonel. Leighton resigned as commanding officer in 1883. The painter James Whistler famously described the then Sir Frederic Leighton, the commanding officer of the Artists Rifles, as the: "Colonel of the Royal Academy and the President of the Artists Rifles – aye, and he paints a little!" At his funeral, on 3 February 1896, his coffin was carried into St Paul's Cathedral, past a guard of honour formed by the Artists Rifles.

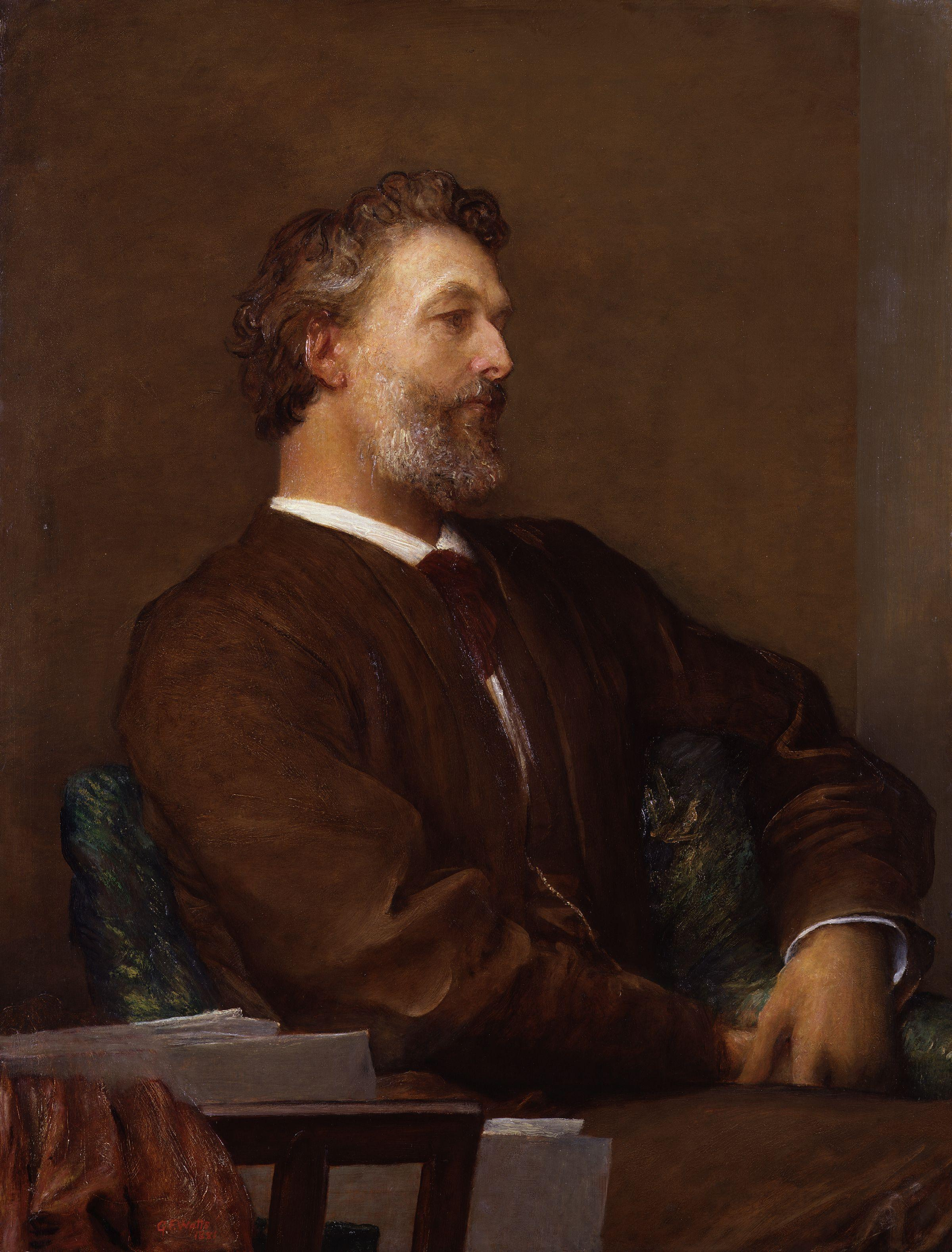
Sir Frederic Leighton by George Frederic Watts (1881)

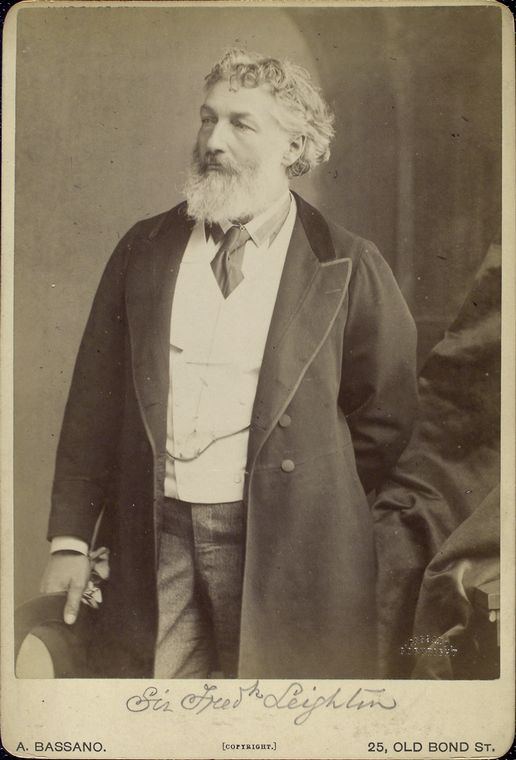
Sir Frederic Leighton, later in his career

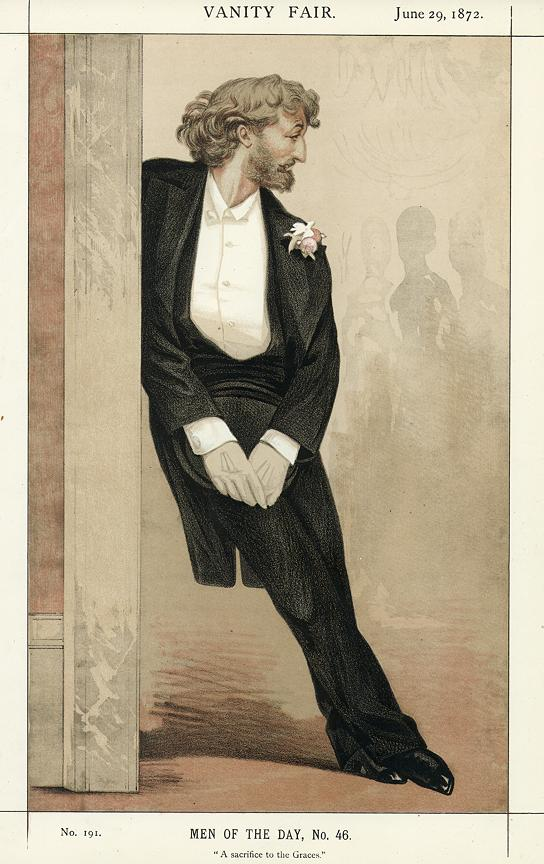
"A sacrifice to the Graces". Caricature by Tissot published in Vanity Fair in 1872

== Honours ==
Escutcheon of the Leighton baronets of St Mary Abbots

- 1864: Associate of the Royal Academy
- 1868: Royal Academy Academician
- 1878: President of the Royal Academy
- 1878: Légion d'honneur Officer
- 1878: Knight Bachelor
- 1886: Created a baronet in the Baronetage of the United Kingdom
- 1889: Associate member of the Institute of France
- 1896: Created a baron in the Peerage of the United Kingdom

== Selected works ==
- Death of Brunelleschi (1852), oil on canvas
- The Fisherman and the Syren, c. 1856–58 (66.3 cm × 48.7 cm (26.1 in × 19.2 in))
- Cimabue's Celebrated Madonna Is Carried in Procession Through the Streets of Florence (1853–55), oil on canvas.
- The Discovery of Juliet Apparently Lifeless (c. 1858)
- The Villa Malta, Rome (1860s), oil on canvas
- The Painter's Honeymoon, c. 1864 (83.8 cm × 77.5 cm (33.0 in × 30.5 in))
- Mother and Child, c. 1865 (48.2 cm × 82 cm (19.0 in × 32.3 in))
- Actaea, the Nymph of the Shore (1868), oil on canvas (57.2 cm × 102.2 cm (22.5 in × 40.2 in)), National Gallery of Canada, Ottawa.
- Daedalus and Icarus, c. 1869 (138.2 cm × 106.5 cm (54.4 in × 41.9 in))
- Hercules Wrestling with Death for the Body of Alcestis (1869–71) (132.4 cm × 265.4 cm (52.1 in × 104.5 in))
- After Vespers, 1871 (111.5 cm × 71.5 cm (43.9 in × 28.1 in)), Princeton University Art Museum
- Greek Girls Picking up Pebbles by the Sea, 1871 (84 cm × 129.5 cm (33.1 in × 51.0 in))
- Teresina (c. 1874) Christchurch Art Gallery Te Puna o Waiwhetu, Christchurch, New Zealand
- Music Lesson, c. 1877 (92.8 cm × 118.1 cm (36.5 in × 46.5 in))
- An Athlete Wrestling with a Python (1877), bronze sculpture
- Nausicaa, c. 1878 (145 cm × 67 cm (57 in × 26 in))
- Winding the Skein, c. 1878 (100.3 cm × 161.3 cm (39.5 in × 63.5 in))
- Light of the Harem, c. 1880 (152.4 cm × 83.8 cm (60.0 in × 33.0 in))
- Idyll, c. 1880–81
- Wedded, (c. 1881–1882) (145.4 cm × 81 cm (57.2 in × 31.9 in))
- Cymon and Iphigenia (1884) Art Gallery of New South Wales
- Captive Andromache, c. 1888 (197 cm × 406.5 cm (77.6 in × 160.0 in))
- The Bath of Psyche (c. 1889–90) (189.2 cm × 62.2 cm (74.5 in × 24.5 in)) Tate Gallery
- The Garden of the Hesperides, c. 1892 (169 cm × 169 cm (67 in × 67 in)), Lady Lever Art Gallery
- Flaming June (1895), oil on canvas, Museo de Arte de Ponce, Puerto Rico (120.6 cm × 120.6 cm (47.5 in × 47.5 in))
- The Parable of the Wise and Foolish Virgins (Fresco)
- The armlet
- Phoebe (55.88 cm × 60.96 cm (22.00 in × 24.00 in))
- A Bather
- The Leighton Frescoes, The Arts of Industry as Applied to War and The Arts of Industry as Applied to Peace
- Phoenicians Trading with the Early Britons on the Coast of Cornwall, 1895. Mural at the Royal Exchange, London
- The Return of Persephone, 1891, oil on canvas, Leeds Art Gallery

== Gallery ==
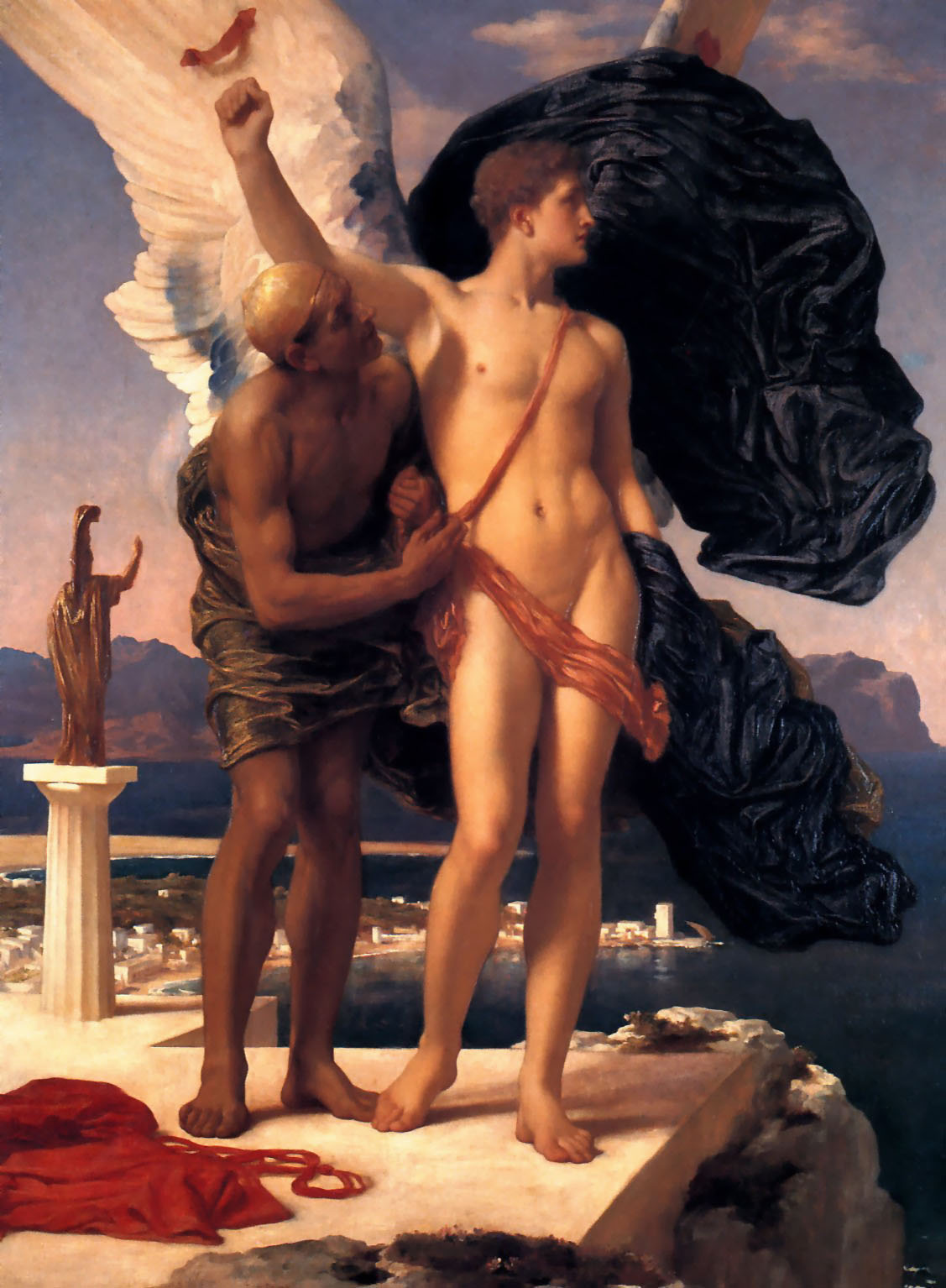
Icarus and Daedalus, c. 1869

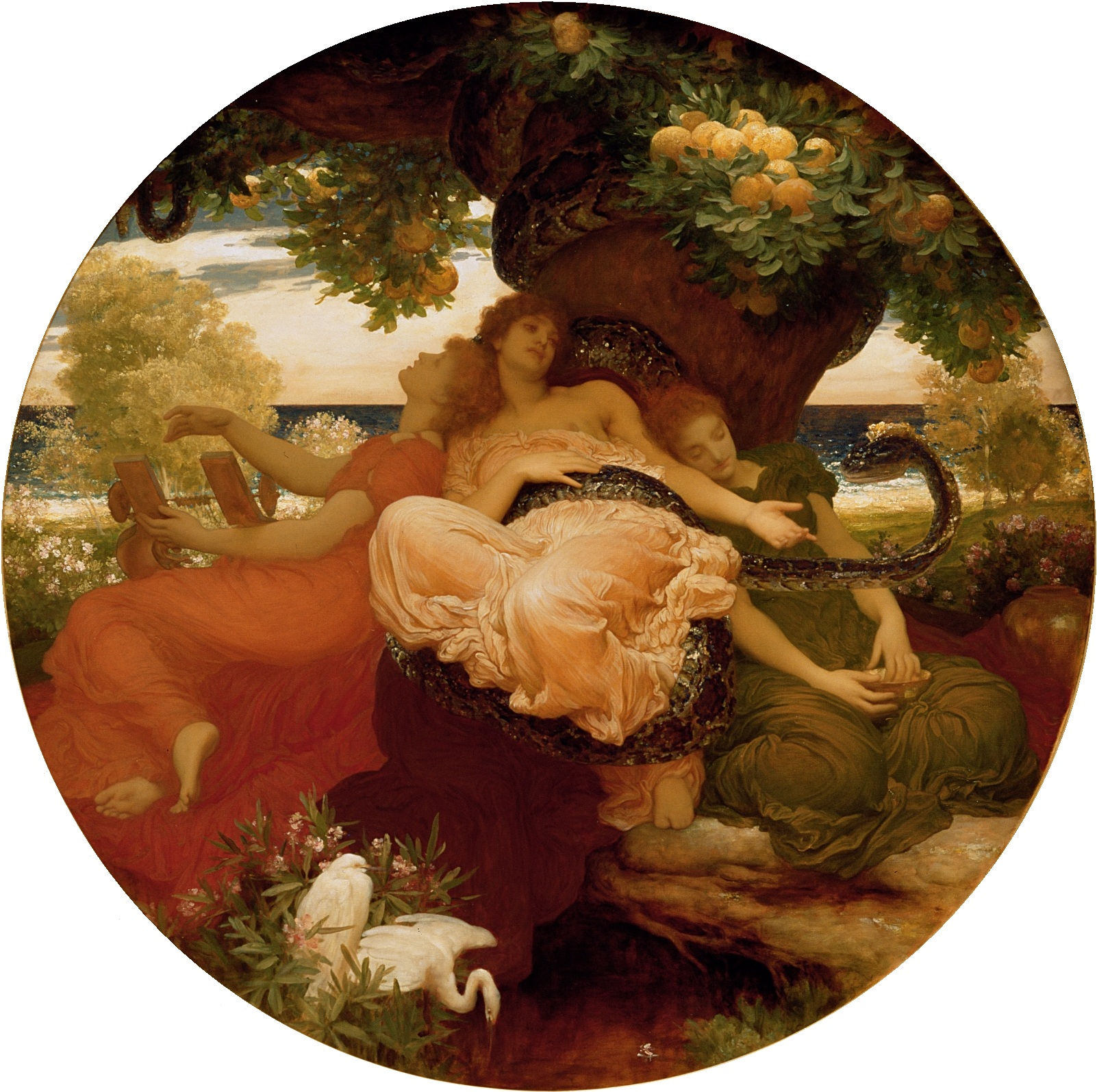
The Garden of the Hesperides, oil on canvas painting, 1892, Lady Lever Art Gallery

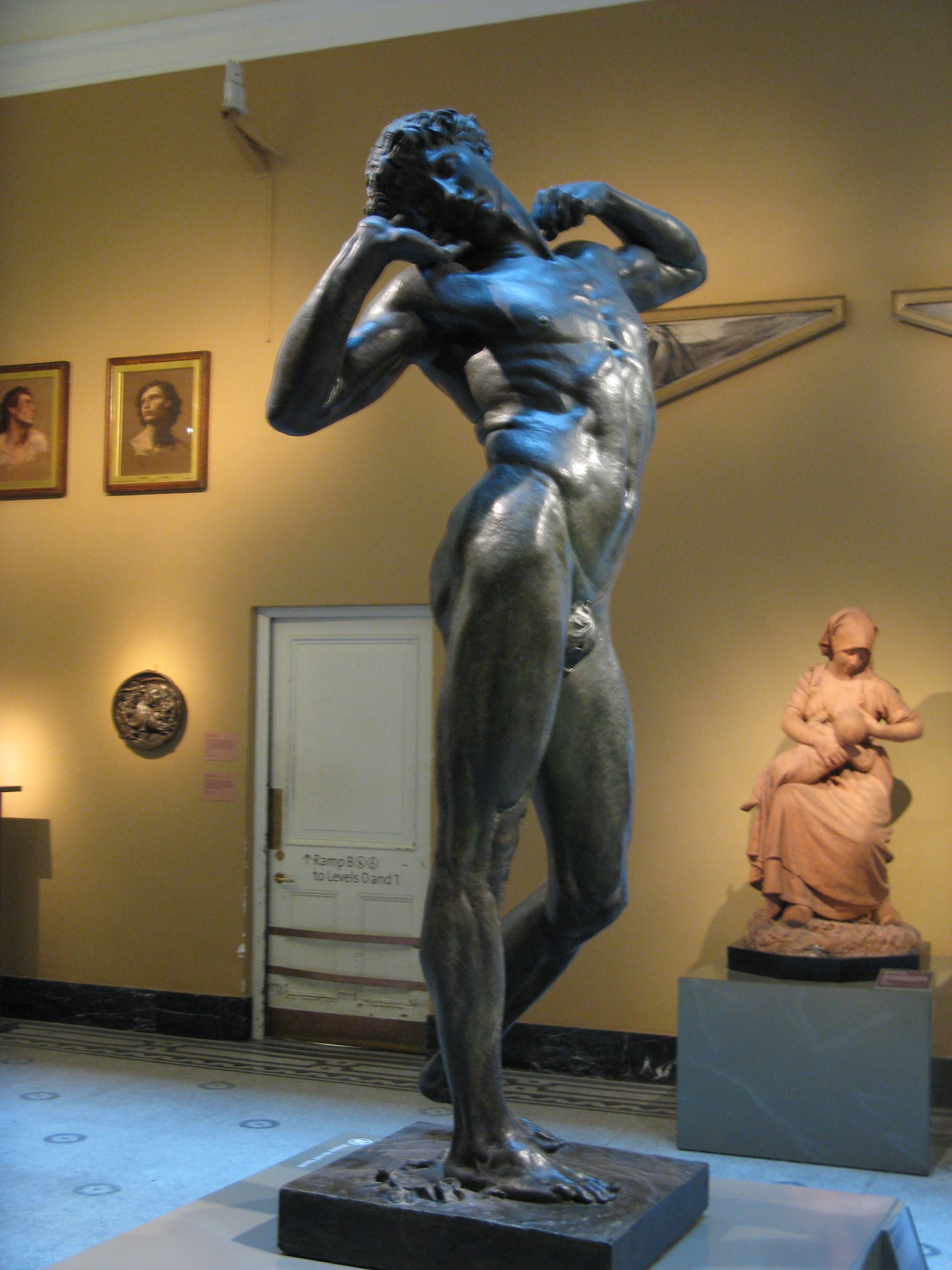
The Sluggard, 1885

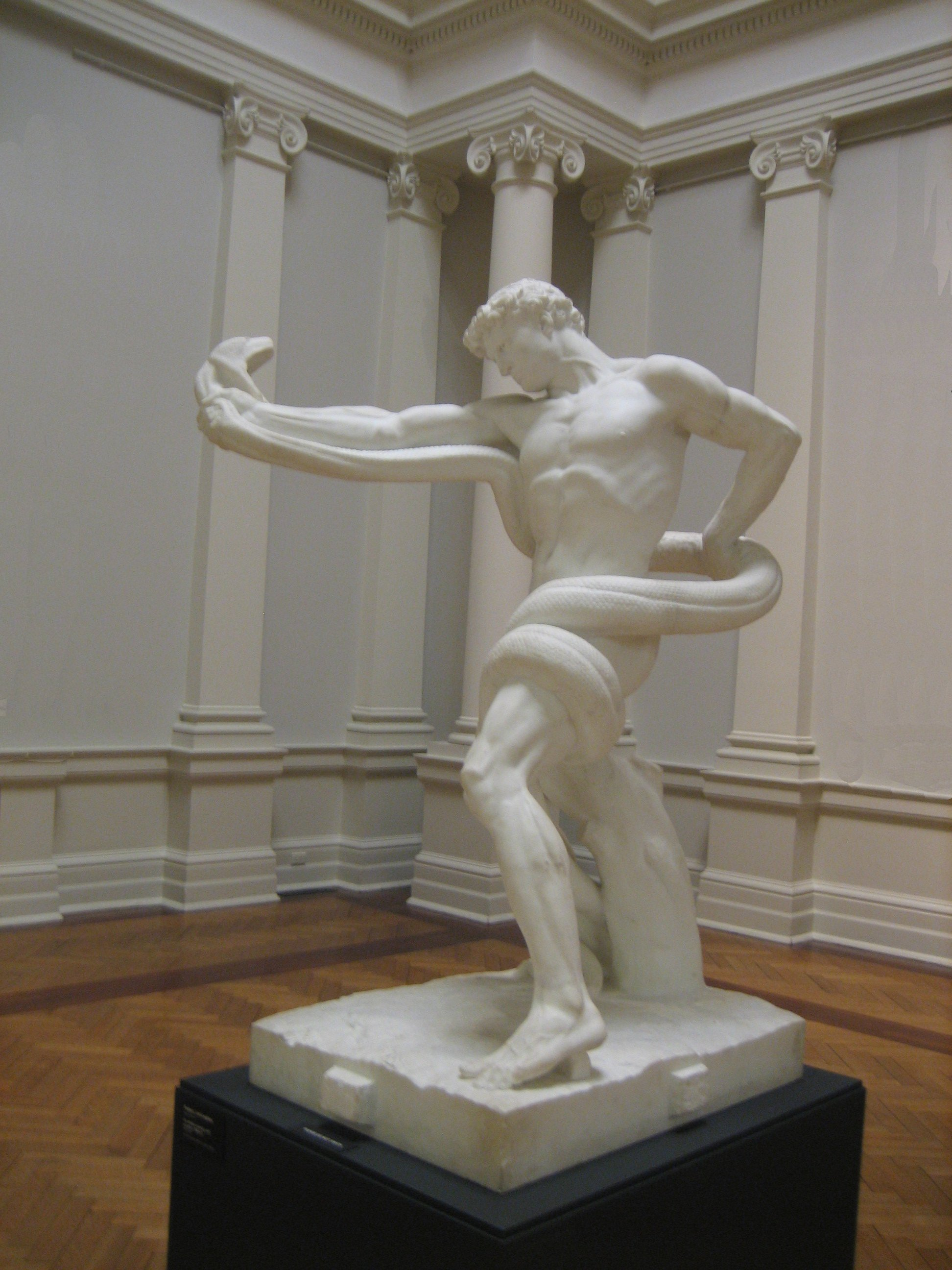
Athlete wrestling with a Python, white marble sculpture, 1888–1891 (Private collection: on loan to the Art Gallery of New South Wales)

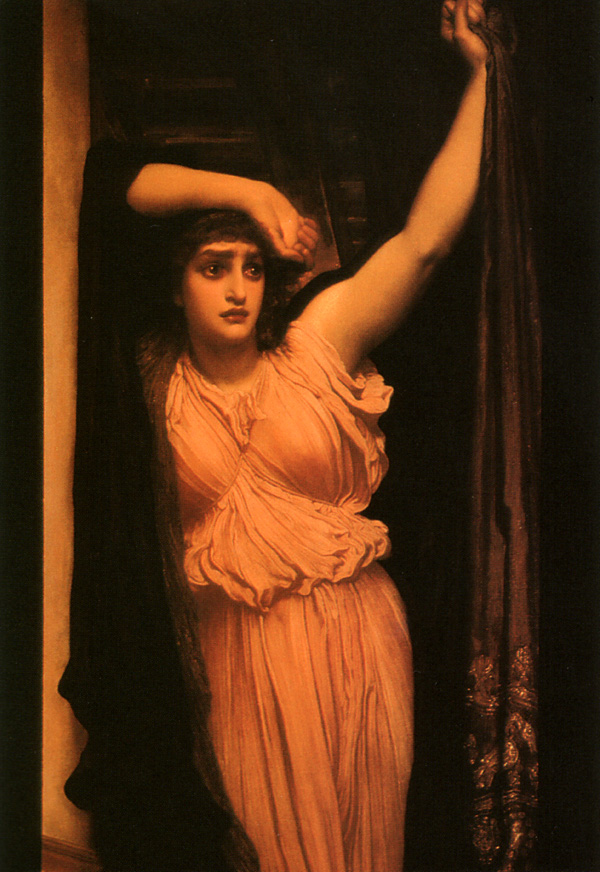
The Last Watch of Hero, 1880

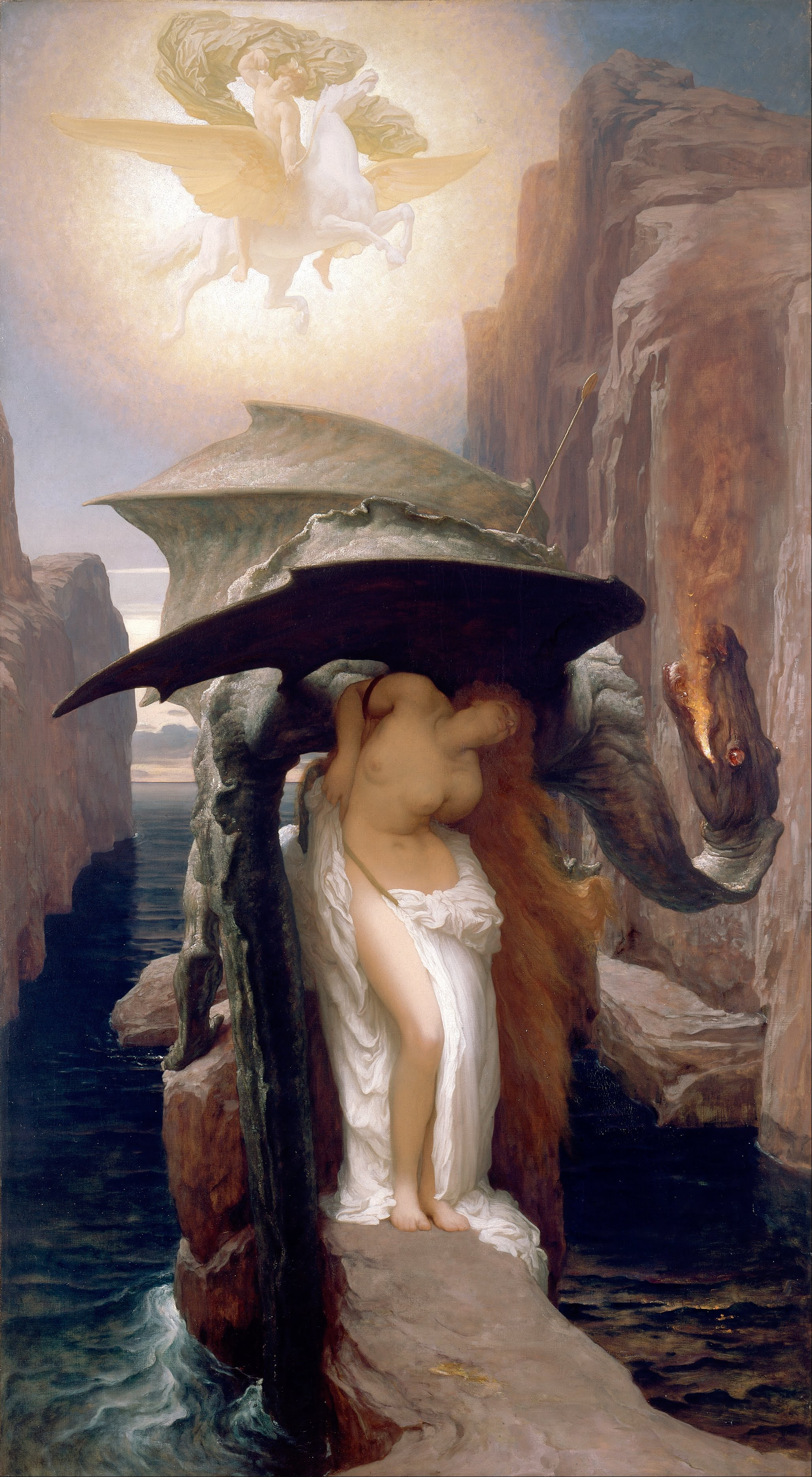
Perseus and Andromeda, 1891, Walker Art Gallery, Liverpool.

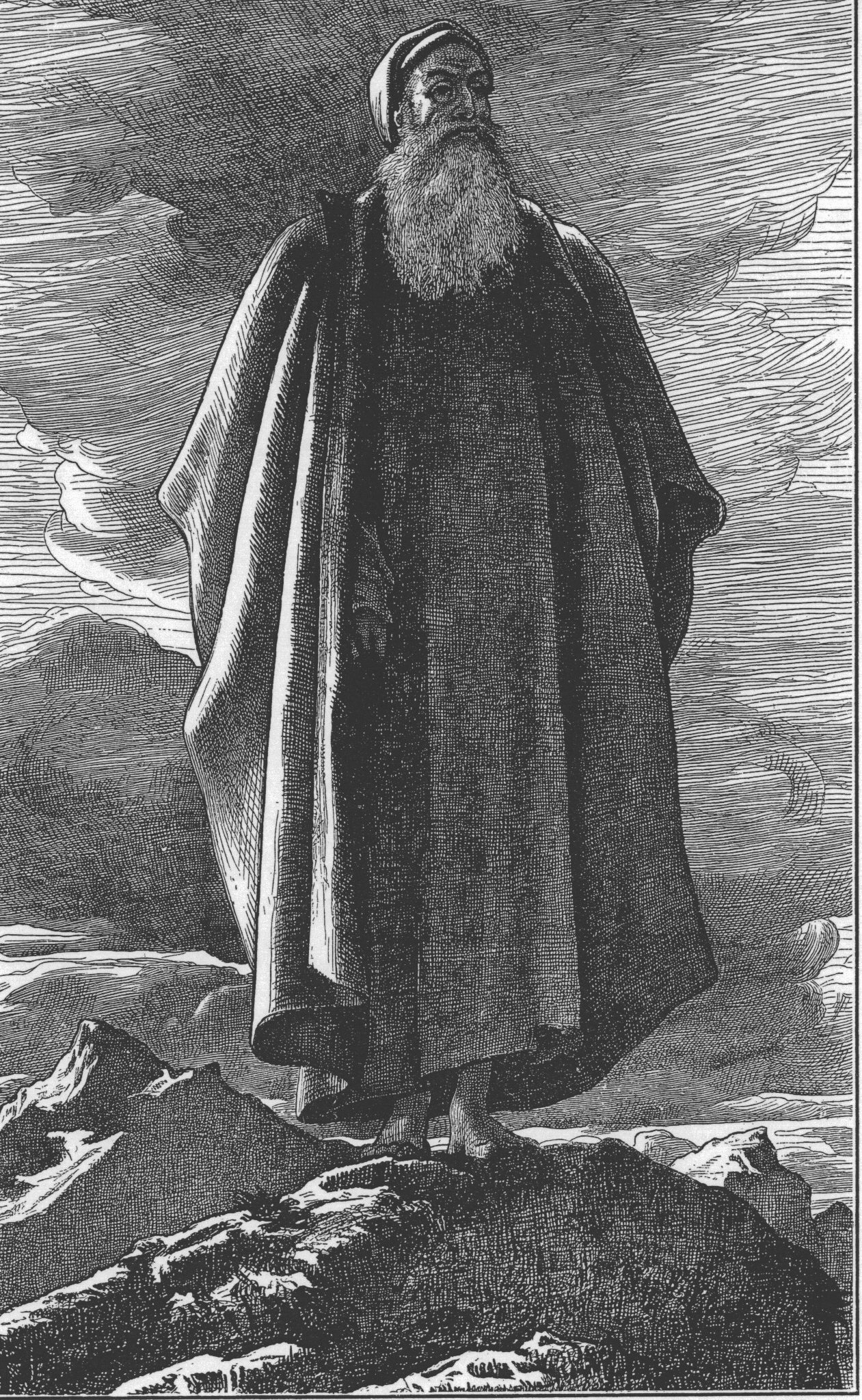
Moses views the Promised Land

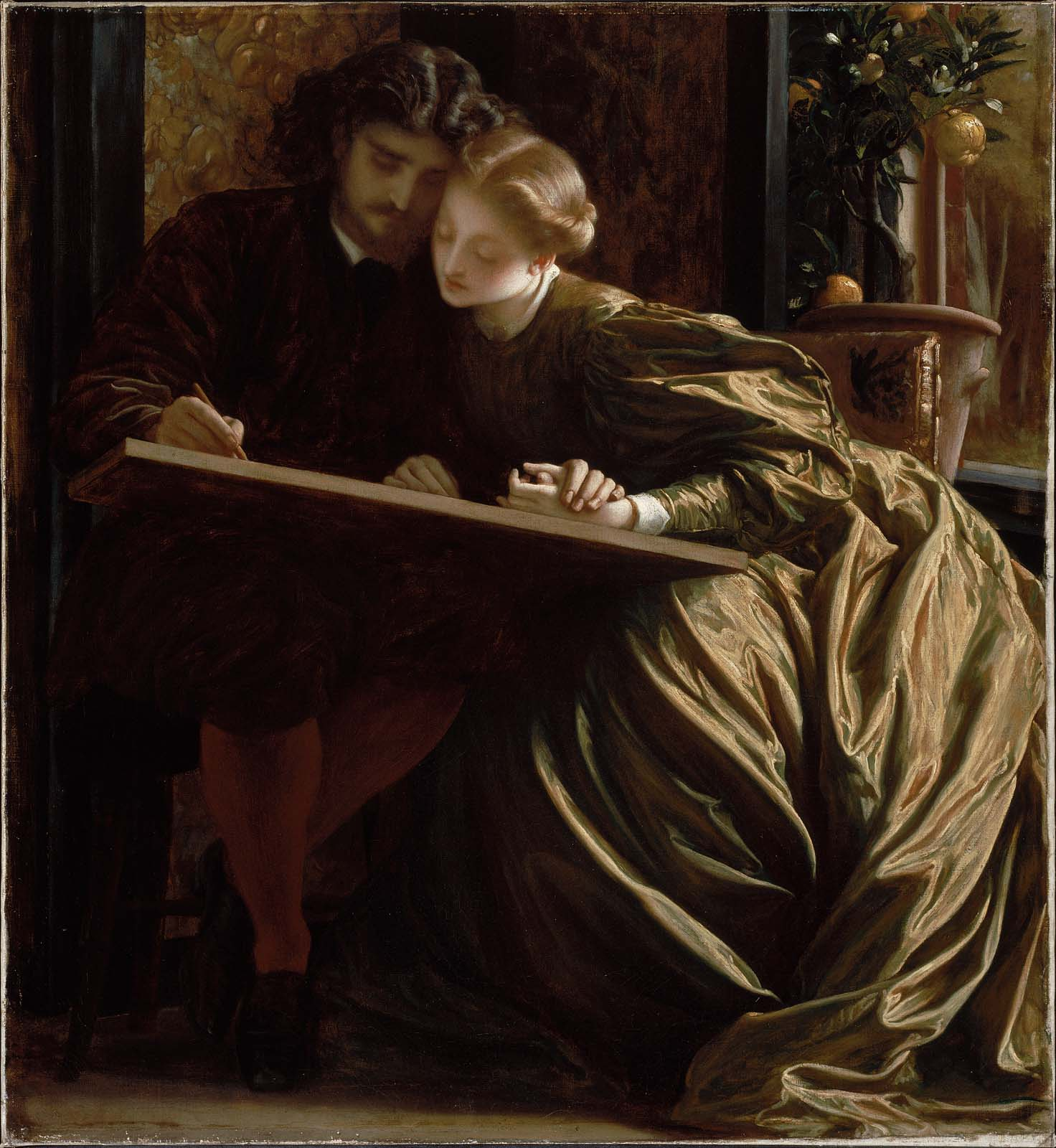
The Painter's Honeymoon, 1864

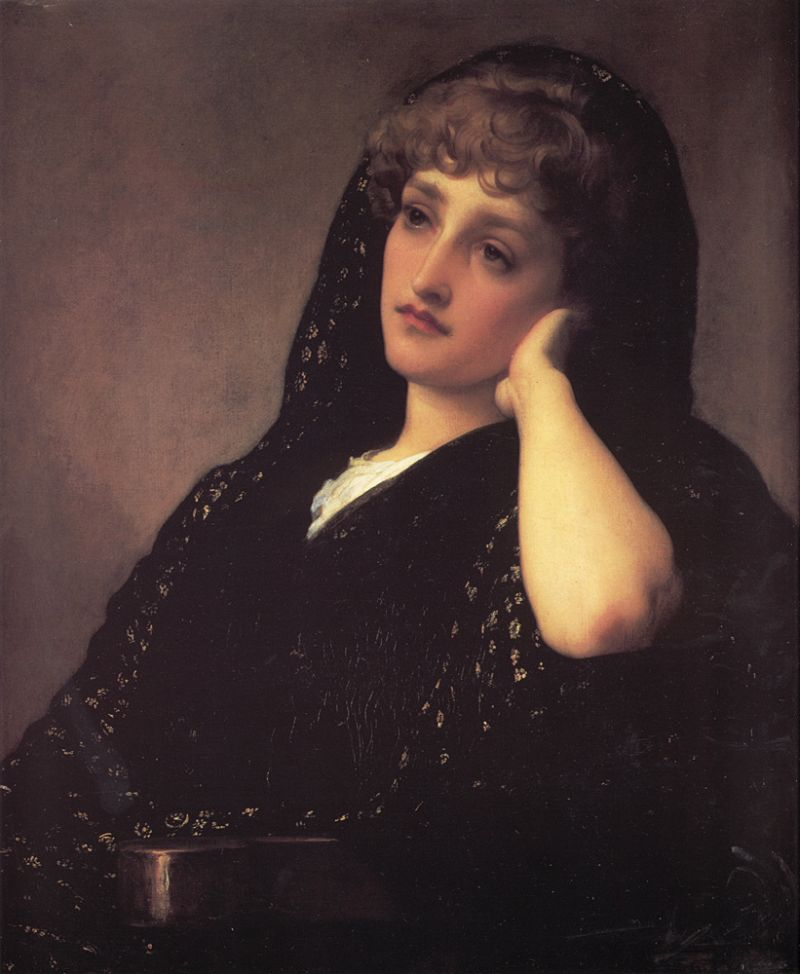
Memories, 1883

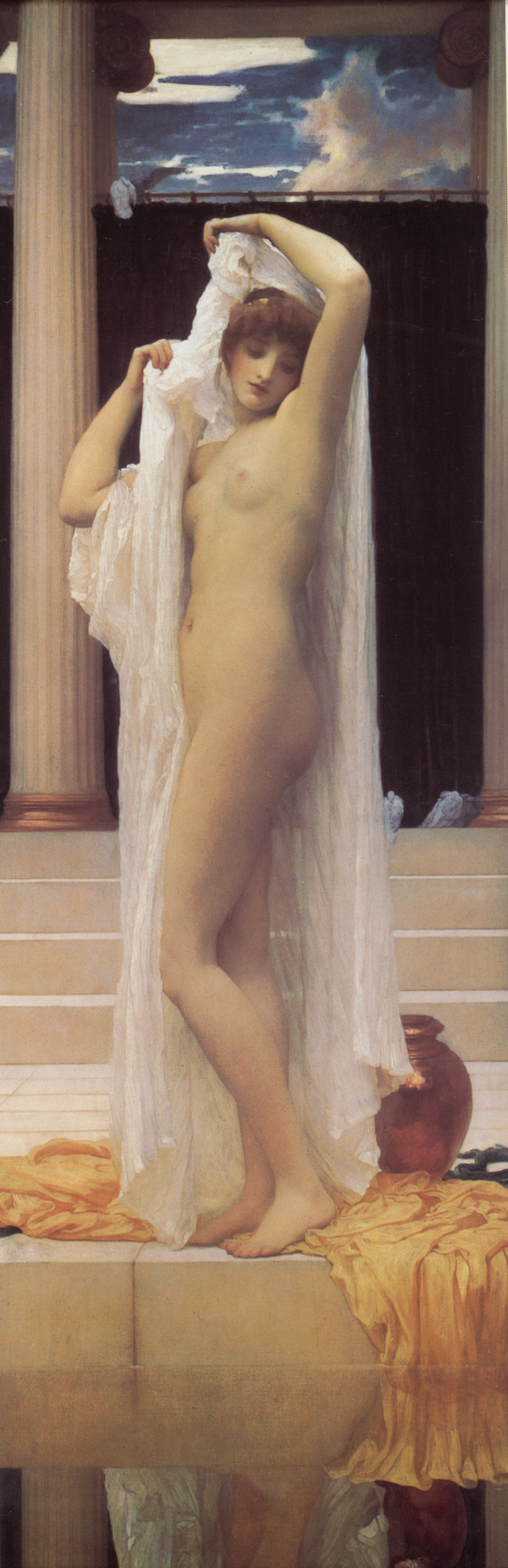
The Bath of Psyche, 1879

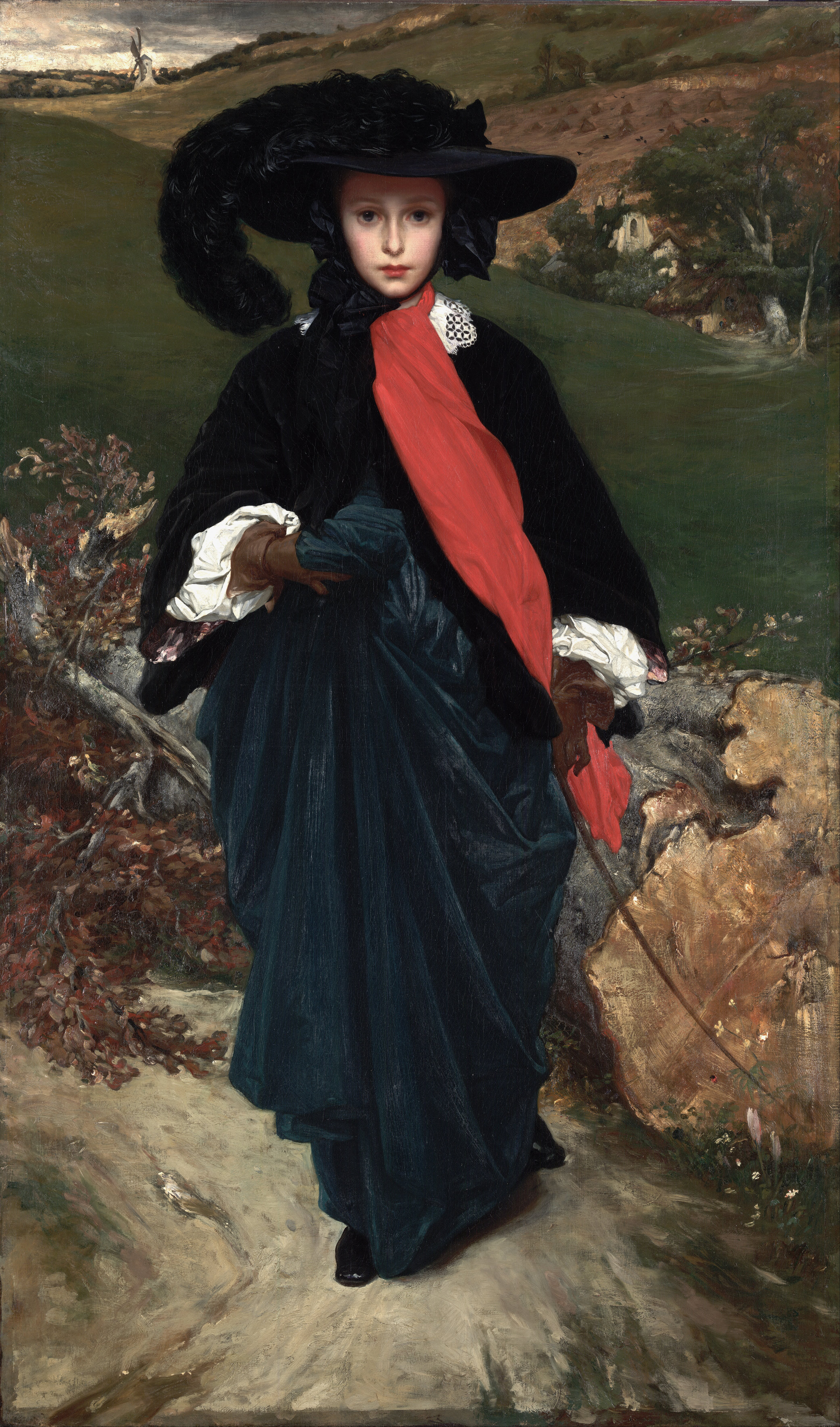
Portrait of May Sartoris

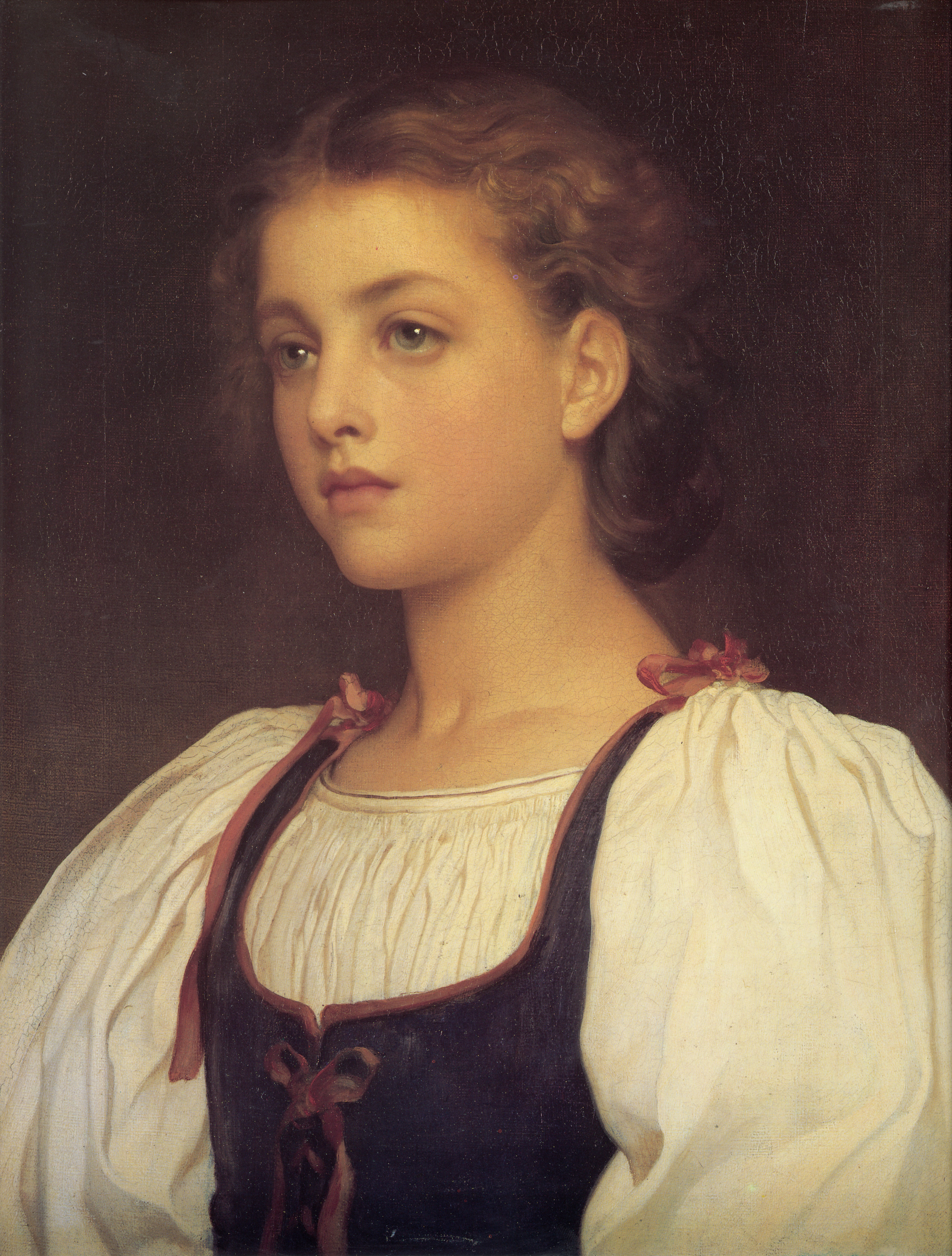
Biondina, 1879

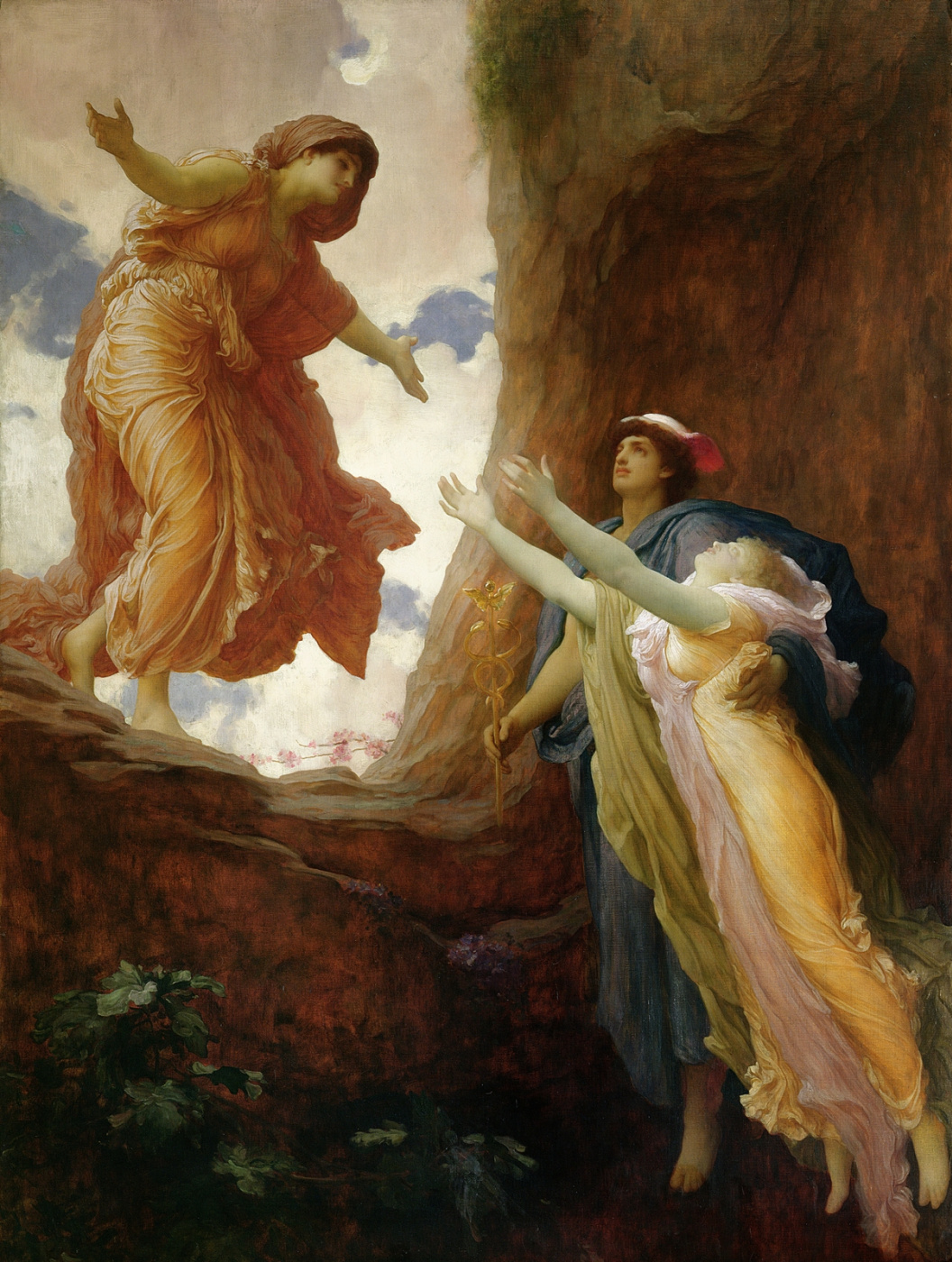
The Return of Persephone, 1891

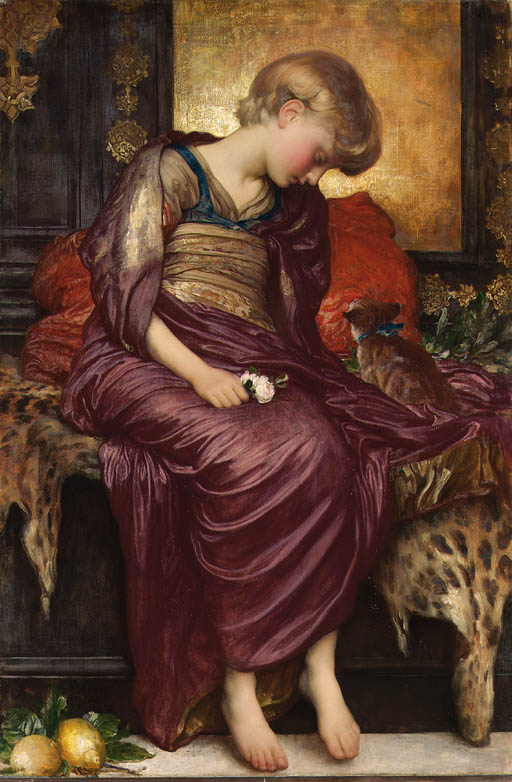
Kittens, 1883

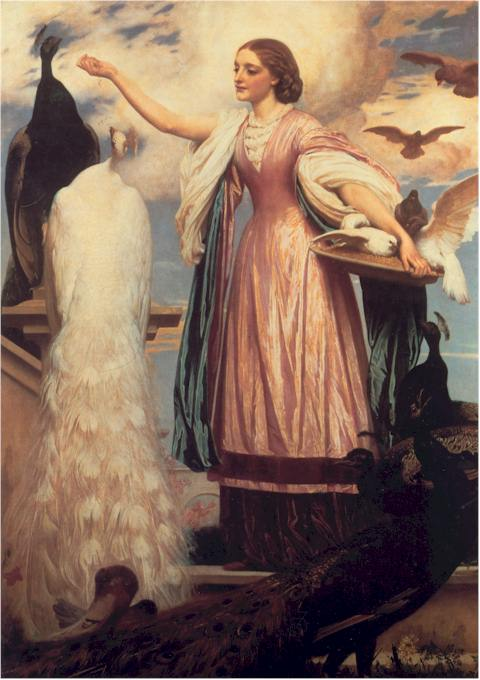
A Girl Feeding Peacocks, c. 1863

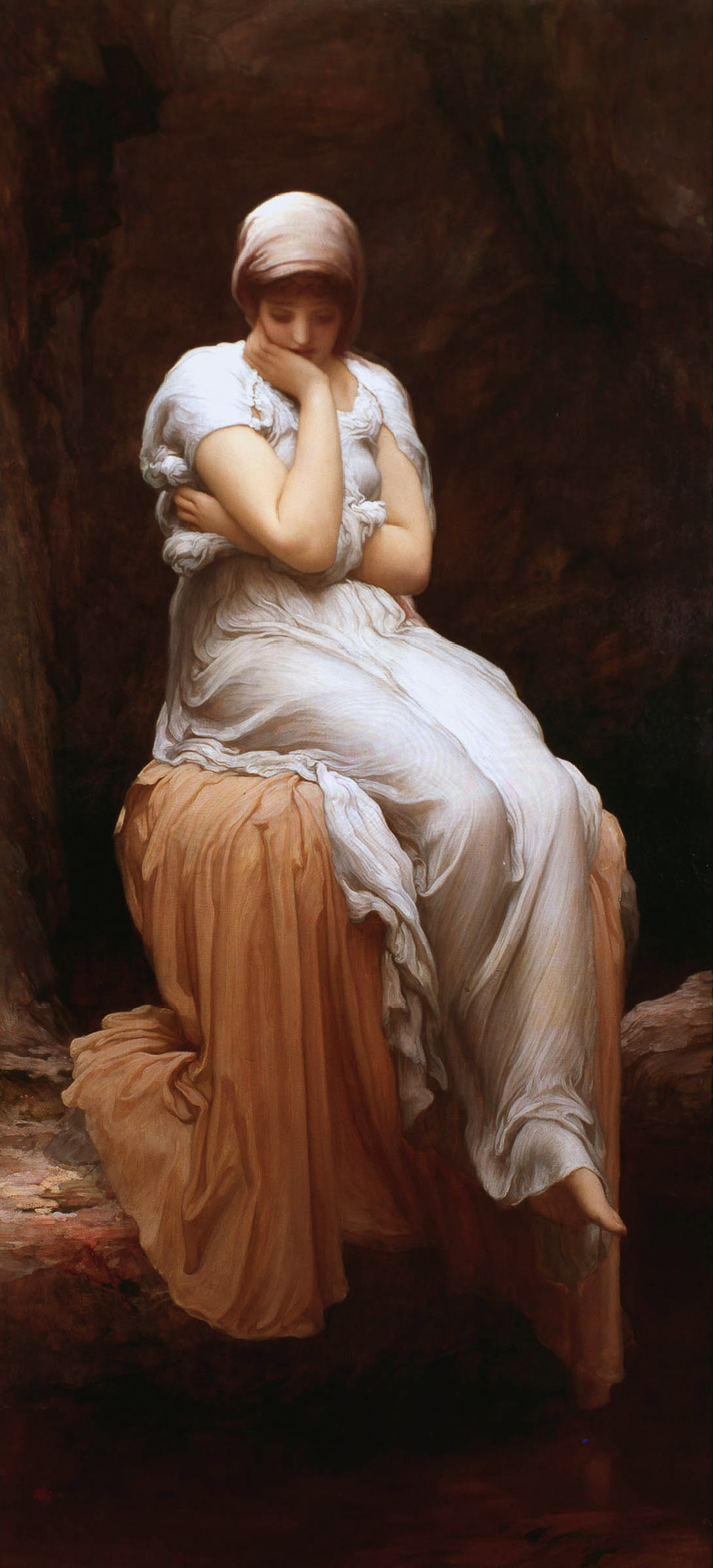
Solitude, c. 1890
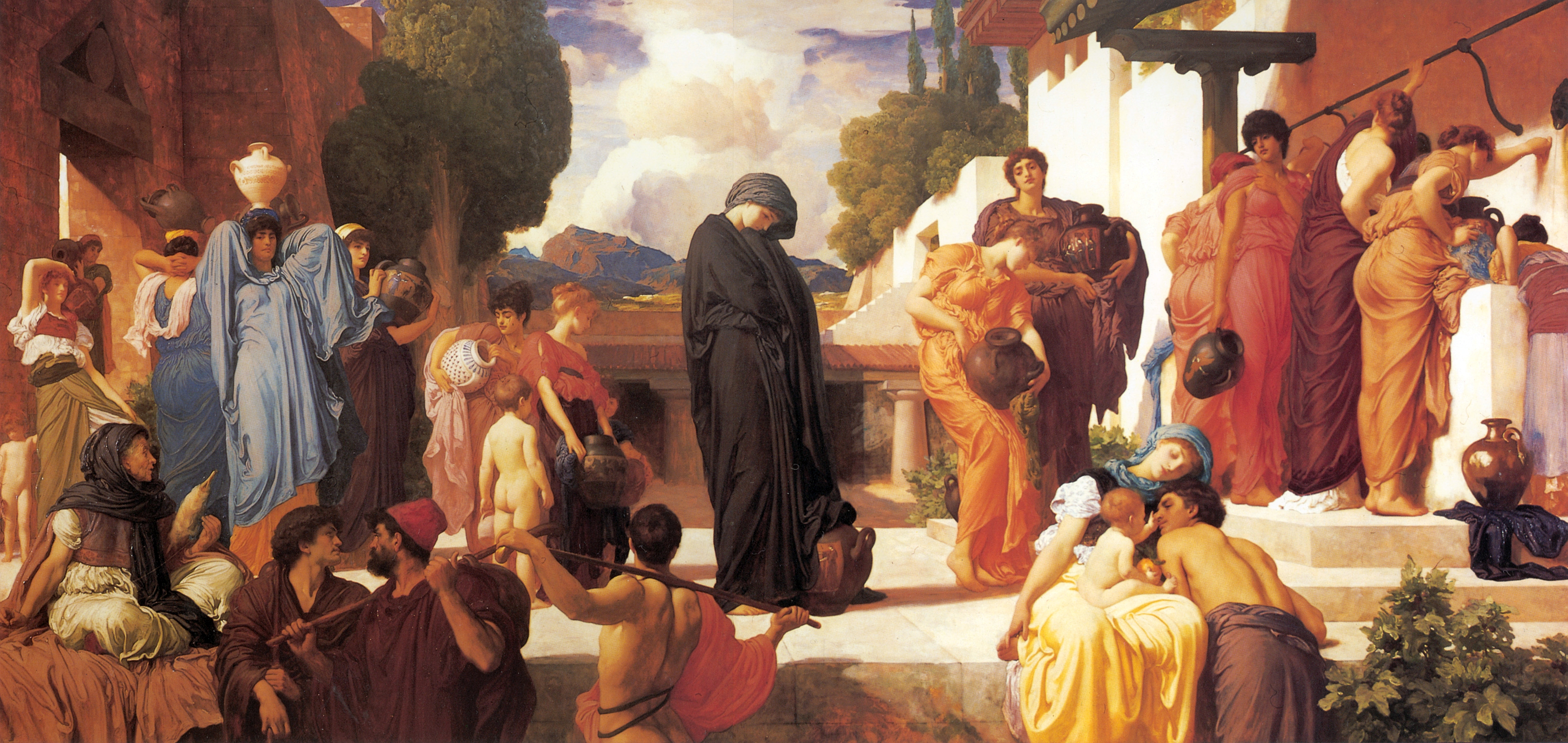
Captive Andromache, oil on canvas painting, 1886–1888, Manchester City Art Gallery

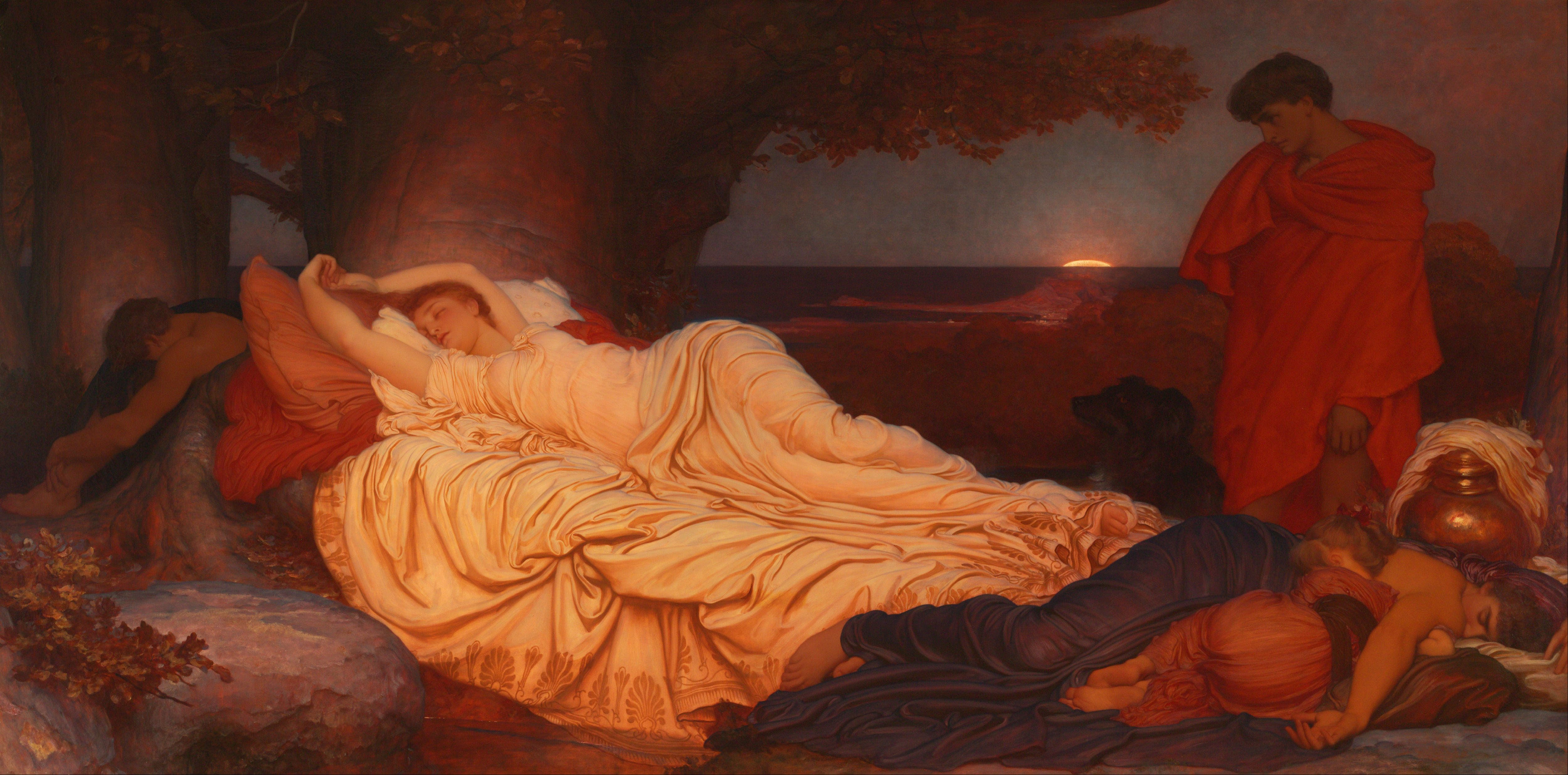
Cymon and Iphigenia, oil on canvas painting, 1884, Art Gallery of New South Wales

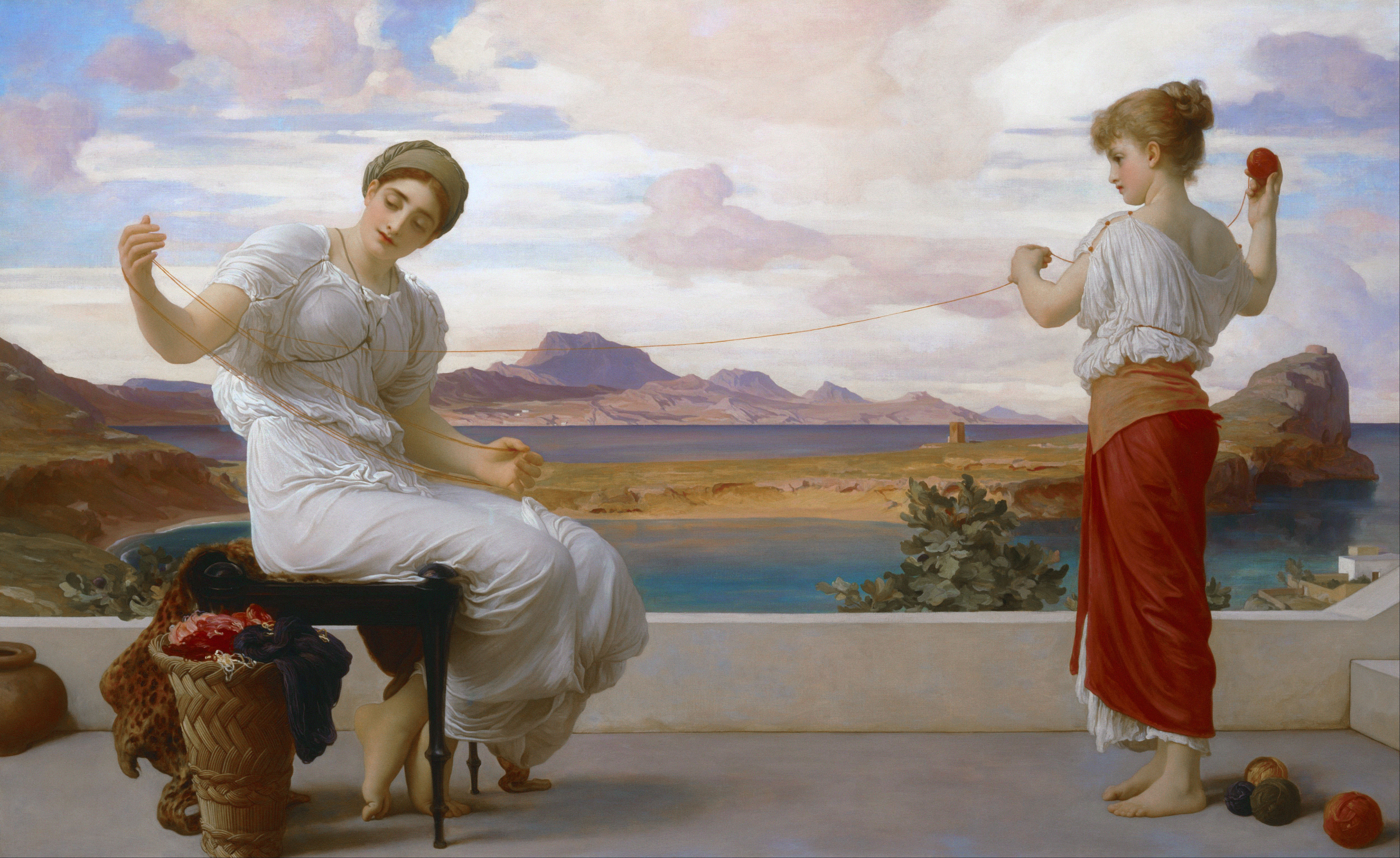
Winding the skein, 1878

== See also ==
- Romola – the 1863 novel by George Eliot for which Leighton did the illustrations

== General references ==
- Monkhouse, William Cosmo (1911). "Leighton, Frederick Leighton, Baron" . In Chisholm, Hugh (ed.). Encyclopædia Britannica. Vol. 16 (11th ed.). Cambridge University Press. pp. 396–398.

Cultural offices
Preceded by Sir Francis Grant	President of the Royal Academy; 1878–1896	Succeeded by Sir John Everett Millais, Bt
Peerage of the United Kingdom
New creation	Baron Leighton; 24–25 January 1896	Extinct
Baronetage of the United Kingdom
New creation	Baronet (of St Mary Abbots); 1886–1896	Extinct
Preceded by Alexander baronets	Leighton baronets of St Mary Abbots; 11 February 1886	Succeeded by Dorington baronets
