= Colarossi =

Colarossi is an Italian surname. Notable people with the surname include:

- Angelo Colarossi (1875–1949), British model
- Domenico Colarossi (Nico Fidenco; 1933–2022), Italian singer and composer
- Filippo Colarossi (1841–1906), Italian sculptor and model
- Mario Colarossi (1929–2010), Italian sprinter
