= Action Comics 1 =

Comic book

Action Comics #1
- Cover of Action Comics #1 (June 1938) by Joe Shuster.

Publication information
- Publisher: DC Comics
- Genre: Action; adventure; fantasy; superhero; Western
- Publication date: April 18, 1938 (on sale); June 1938 (cover date)

Action Comics #1 (cover dated June 1938) is the first issue of the original run of the comic-book/magazine series Action Comics. It features the first appearance of several comic-book heroes—most notably the Jerry Siegel and Joe Shuster creation, Superman—and sold for 10 cents (equivalent to $2 in 2025). It is widely considered to be both the beginning of the superhero genre and the most valuable comic book in the world. Action Comics ran for 904 numbered issues (plus additional out-of-sequence special issues) before it restarted its numbering in the fall of 2011. It returned to its original numbering with issue #957, published on June 8, 2016 (cover-dated August) and reached its 1,000th issue in 2018. On August 24, 2014, a copy graded 9.0 by CGC was sold on eBay for $3,207,852 USD (equivalent to $4,360,000 in 2025); it was the first comic book to have sold for more than $3 million for a single original copy.

== Contents ==
Action Comics #1 was an anthology totaling 68 pages, and contained eleven features:

- "Superman" (pp. 1–13) by Jerry Siegel and Joe Shuster.
- "Chuck Dawson" (pp. 14–19) by H. Fleming (Homer Fleming).
- "Zatara Master Magician" (pp. 20–31) by Fred Guardineer.
- "South Sea Strategy" (text feature, pp. 32–33) by Captain Frank Thomas.
- "Sticky-Mitt Stimson" (pp. 34–37) by Alger, a pen name of Russell Cole.
- "The Adventures of Marco Polo" (pp. 38–41) by Sven Elven.
- "'Pep' Morgan" (pp. 42–45) by Fred Guardineer, credited under his pseudonym Gene Baxter.
- "Scoop Scanlon the Five Star Reporter" (pp. 46–51) by Will Ely.
- "Tex Thomson" (pp. 52–63) by Bernard Baily.
- "Stardust" (p. 64) by "The Star-Gazer".
- "Odds 'N Ends" (inside back cover) by "Moldoff" (Sheldon Moldoff).

== Publication ==
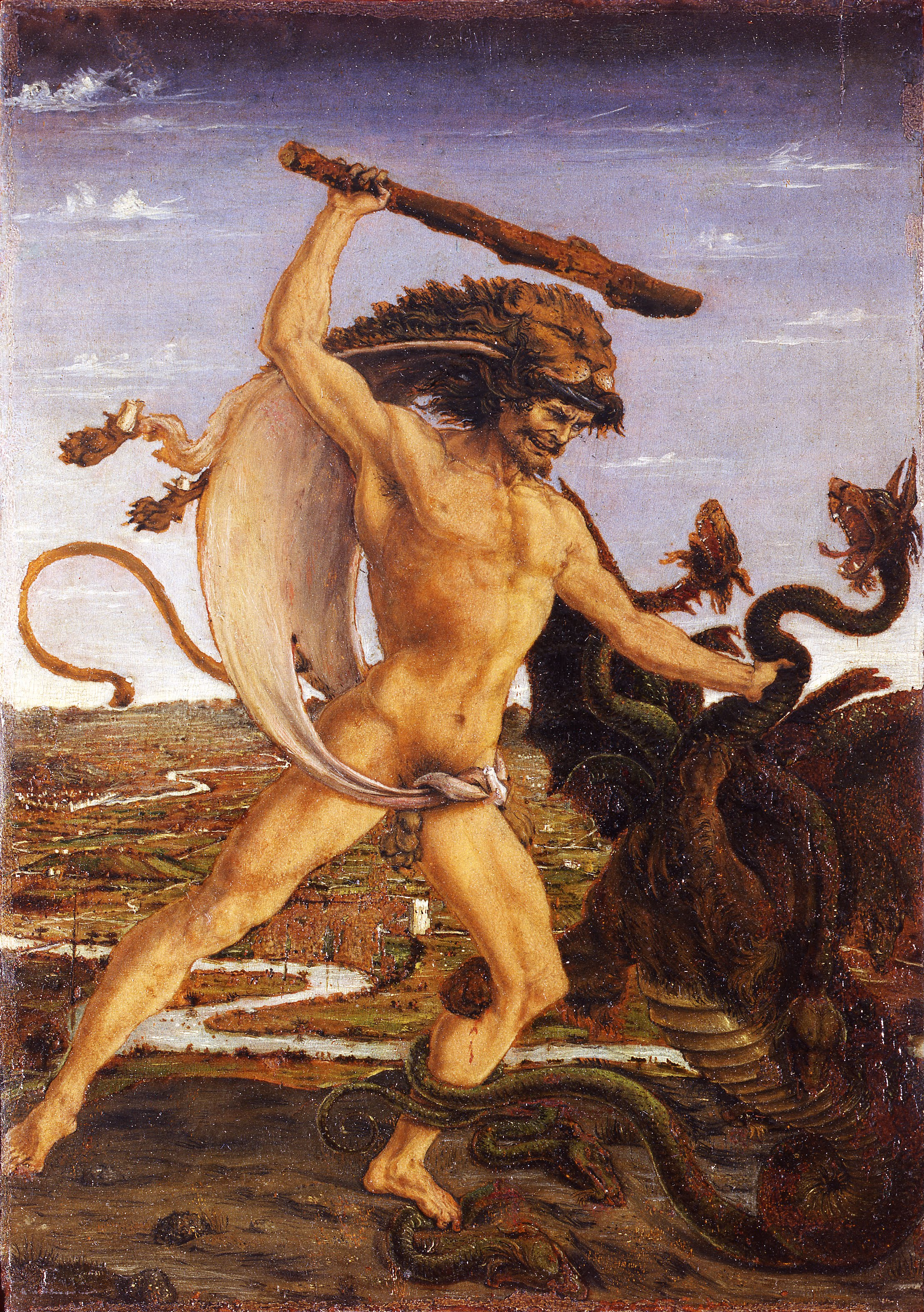
The cover has been compared to Hercules and the Hydra by Antonio del Pollaiuolo.

Published on April 18, 1938 (cover dated June 1938), by National Allied Publications, a corporate predecessor of DC Comics, it is considered the first true superhero comic. Though today Action Comics is a monthly title devoted to Superman, it began, like many early comics, as an anthology. Action Comics was started by publisher Jack Liebowitz. The first issue had a print run of 200,000 copies, which promptly sold out, although it took some time for National to realize that the "Superman" story was responsible for sales of the series that soon approached 1,000,000 a month. Jerry Siegel and Joe Shuster were paid $10 per page, for a total of $130 (equivalent to $2,973 in 2025) for their work on this issue. Liebowitz later said that selecting Superman to run in Action Comics #1 was "pure accident" based on deadline pressure and that he selected a "thrilling" cover, depicting Superman lifting a car over his head. Christopher Knowles, author of Our Gods Wear Spandex: The Secret History of Comic Book Heroes, compared the cover to Hercules and the Hydra by Antonio del Pollaiuolo.

== Superman ==
In January 1933, Jerry Siegel wrote a short prose story titled "The Reign of the Superman", which was illustrated by his friend Joe Shuster and self-published in a science fiction magazine. It told the story of a bald villain with telepathic powers. Trying to create a character they could sell to newspaper syndicates, Siegel re-conceived the "superman" character as a powerful hero, sent to Earth from a more advanced society. He and Shuster developed the idea into a comic strip, which they pitched unsuccessfully. National Publications was looking for a hit to accompany their success with Detective Comics, and did not have time to solicit new material. Jack Liebowitz, co-owner of National Publications, told editor Vin Sullivan to create their fourth comic book. Because of the tight deadline, Sullivan was forced to make it out of inventory and stockpile pages. He found a number of adventurer stories, but needed a lead feature. Sullivan asked former coworker Sheldon Mayer if he could help. Mayer found the rejected Superman comic strips, and Sullivan told Siegel and Shuster that if they could paste them into 13 comic book pages, he would buy them. The original panels were rewritten and redrawn to create the first page of Action Comics #1:

1. Baby Superman is sent to Earth by his scientist father in a "hastily-devised space ship" from "a distant planet" which "was destroyed by old age".
2. After the space ship lands on Earth, "a passing motorist, discovering the sleeping baby within, turned the child over to an orphanage".
3. The baby Superman lifts a large chair overhead with one hand, astounding the orphanage attendants with "his feats of strength".
4. When Superman (now named Clark Kent) reaches maturity, he discovers that he can leap 1/8 of a mile, hurdle 20-story buildings, "raise tremendous weights", outrun a train, and "that nothing less than a bursting shell could penetrate his skin".
5. Clark decides that "he must turn his titanic strength into channels that would benefit mankind, and so was created 'Superman', champion of the oppressed...."

Two new panels offering a "scientific explanation of Clark Kent's amazing strength" were added. The panels do not identify Superman's home planet by name or explain how he was named Clark Kent. The next twelve pages showed Superman attempting to save an innocent woman about to be executed while delivering the real murderess, bound and gagged, and leaving her on the lawn of the state Governor's mansion after breaking through the door into his house with a signed confession; coming to the aid of a woman being beaten by her husband, who faints when his knife shatters on Superman's skin; rescuing Lois Lane (who also debuts in this issue) from a gangster who abducted her after she rebuffed him at a nightclub, which leads to the cover scene with the car; and going to Washington, D.C. to investigate a Senator who he suspects is corrupt, prompting a confession by leaping around high buildings with the terrified man, which leads into the next issue. All the while, Clark tries to keep Superman out of the papers.

== Collectibility ==
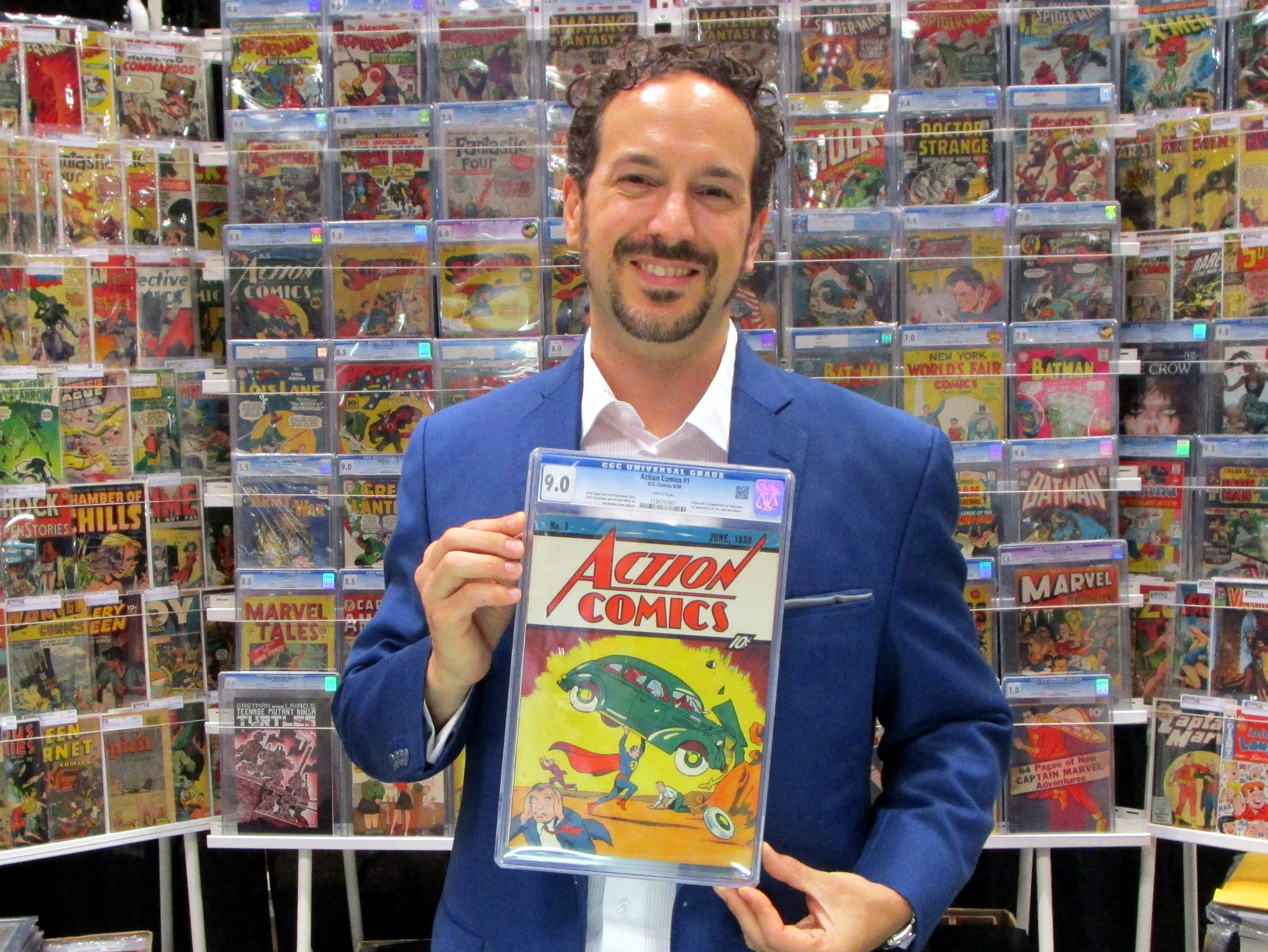
At the 2014 New York Comic Con, Vincent Zurzolo of Metropolis Collectibles displays the CGC 9.0 copy of Action Comics #1 for which his firm paid $3.2 million (USD).

Comics Buyer's Guide estimated in 2012 that only 50 to 100 original copies of Action Comics #1 exist. In an April 2021 Associated Press article, Vincent Zurzolo, COO of ComicConnect.com, an online auction and consignment company, said that it was estimated that about 100 copies of the issue were still in existence. Action Comics #1 has set several sales records for comic books. On February 22, 2010, a copy of Action Comics #1 CGC Grade 8.0 sold at auction for US$1 million, becoming the first million-dollar comic book. The sale, by an anonymous seller to an anonymous buyer, was through ComicConnect.com. Also that year, on March 29, ComicConnect.com sold another copy for US$1.5 million, making it the most expensive and most valuable comic book of all time. The copy sold is the third highest-graded copy from the CGC, which stands at 8.5 VF+ grade, which Zurzolo said was among the best-kept copies. As of 2011, there were six known Comic Guaranty LLC (CGC)-graded copies with a grade above VG (CGC 4.0), with only one issue having the grade of VF/NM (CGC 9.0) at that time. EC and Mad publisher William Gaines, whose father was also a comic book publisher and had business dealings with DC Comics at the time Action Comics #1 was published, claimed in a Comics Journal interview that he at one point had dozens of copies of the issue around his house, but they were probably all thrown out. Another copy, rated CGC 5 ("Very Good/Fine"), was discovered in July 2010 by a family facing foreclosure on their home while packing their possessions. Estimated by ComicConnect.com to sell as high as $250,000, the comic fetched $436,000 at auction, saving the family's home. One copy was stolen from American actor Nicolas Cage, an avid comic book collector, in 2000. In March 2011, it was found in a storage locker in the San Fernando Valley and was verified by ComicConnect.com to be the copy sold to Cage previously. Cage had previously received an insurance payment for the item. A copy which was sold for $2.16 million on November 30 the same year through ComicConnect.com is believed to have been this same one, having been noted as stolen in 2000 and recovered in 2011. The Hollywood Reporter mentioned in its March 2012 issue that a film was in development based on the theft of Cage's copy of the comic book and would be titled Action No. 1. The screenplay was a spec script written by Reno 911! creators Robert Ben Garant and Thomas Lennon and sold to Lionsgate. They were attached to produce along with Peter Principato and Paul Young. A CGC 9.0-graded comic, with white pages, was auctioned for sale on eBay in August 2014. The seller, Darren Adams, a comic-book store owner in Federal Way, Washington, had purchased the issue from the estate of a man who had originally bought the issue from a newsstand on its release in 1938. The original buyer lived in high altitudes in West Virginia and stored the comic in a stack with others, which provided the optimal "cool, dry and dark" conditions that lent well to a comic's age, according to Adams. The comic changed hands twice prior to the auction; first sold as part of an estate sale when the original purchaser died forty years after its publication, and then to a third person who held the comic for about thirty years. Some years prior to the auction, Adams was contacted by this third person, and seeing the pristine condition of the comic, purchased it for a "seven figure sum". He held onto the comic for a few years before deciding to sell it, keeping the existence of it otherwise a secret, even rejecting a $3 million offer to buy the comic outright. After discussions with representatives from eBay, Adams and the company arranged to donate 1% of the sale to the Christopher & Dana Reeve Foundation, reflecting on Christopher Reeve's role as Superman in motion pictures. The auction ended on August 24 and was sold for over $3.2 million. At the time, it was the highest value ever paid for a single issue of a comic book. The purchasers were Vincent Zurzolo and Stephen Fishler, the owners of Metropolis Collectibles; Zurzolo expected the value of the near-mint comic to continue to increase in time. The record for the highest amount paid for a copy was narrowly broken again on April 6, 2021, when ComicConnect.com announced that another copy of the issue was sold for $3.25 million in a private sale. The seller of the copy had purchased it in 2018 for slightly over $2 million. A new record for the highest amount paid for a copy was set at $6 million US on April 4, 2024, when Heritage Auctions brokered the sale of a specimen graded 8.5 by CGC. In January 2026, a new sales record was announced, when a CGC 9.0-graded copy (the same one previously stolen from Cage) sold for US$15 million in a private transaction. The sale was negotiated by Manhattan-based dealers Metropolis Collectibles and Comic Connect and was publicly disclosed on January 9, 2026. Both the buyer and the seller remained anonymous. In May 2026, a CGC 7.0 conserved copy of Action Comics #1 was sold for $1.4million at Heritage Auctions.

== Reprints ==
The first reprint of Action Comics #1 was published in 1974 as part of the "Famous First Editions" series. Beginning in the mid-1970s, DC reissued several of its most popular Golden Age comics as "Famous First Editions". These reprints were oversized, roughly double the size of the original editions, and had a cardboard-like cover. The interior was an exact reprint of the original comic, including the advertisements. As a result, the Overstreet Comic Book Price Guide has, since the 1970s, published a warning advising that attempts have been made to pass off the reprint, stripped of its Famous First Edition cardboard cover, as an actual #1. However, the Guide does not cite any actual instances of this. Beyond the Famous First Editions treasury, the story was also reprinted several times as a promotional or mail-in giveaway. Two 16-page abridged reprints were distributed as retail promotions in 1976, one tied to a Safeguard soap offer and the other to a sleeping-bag offer; a similar mail-in reprint tied to a Superman-branded peanut butter promotion followed in 1983, and another was given away with Nestlé Quik in 1987. In the early 1990s, DC issued further low-priced reprints of the issue coinciding with the Death of Superman storyline. DC reprinted Action Comics #1 in 1988 as part of the 50th anniversary celebration of Superman that year. This edition reprinted only the Superman story, with a 50¢ U.S.A. cover price. The complete issue was reprinted in 1998 with an additional half-cover featuring the Superman stamp from the U.S. Postal Service's "Celebrate the Century" commemorative stamp series along with a "First Day of Issue" cancellation. It was sold by the U.S. Postal Service, shrinkwrapped, for $7.95. The complete issue, save for the inside front, inside back, and outside back cover, was reprinted in 2000 as part of DC Comics' Millennium Edition series of reprints of famous DC comics. The 1988, 1998 and 2000 reprints were published to the page-size standard of the 1988–2000 period, and not the larger page size utilized by Action Comics in 1938. A miniature 22-page reprint of the issue, measuring roughly 1.3 by 1.9 inches, was packaged with a DC Direct Superman action figure in 2004. A further reprint of the complete issue was distributed through the Loot Crate subscription box service in 2017, the same year DC also issued convention-exclusive variant-cover reprints of the issue. DC Comics published a Facsimile Edition reprint of Action Comics #1, reprinting the complete book in its entirety (including the inside front, inside back, and outside back covers), in 2022. It had a cover price of $6.99.

== Relaunches ==
In September 2011, DC Comics canceled all of its monthly books, and relaunched 52 new ongoing titles, with a completely new fictional continuity, an initiative branded The New 52. This included ending the original 73-year run of Action Comics with issue #904, October (on sale August 24). The first issue of Action Comics volume 2, with a cover date of November, went on sale September 7. The New 52 version of Action Comics #1 went through five printings. The fifth printing, which went on sale March 28, 2012, is cover-dated May in both the UPC box on the cover and the indicia, with no mention of its original November 2011 cover date. In 2016, as part of the DC Rebirth relaunch, DC restored Action Comics' original numbering, releasing Action Comics vol. 1 #957 after Action Comics vol. 2 #52. Subsequently, a commemorative poster celebrating 1,000 issues of Action Comics was released in 2018, which retroactively listed all issues of the New 52 Action Comics vol. 2 with their cumulative issue numbers. As a result, Action Comics vol. 2 #1 is now also considered to be Action Comics vol. 1 #905 overall.

== See also ==
- List of most expensive books and manuscripts
