= Metropolis Collectibles =

Metropolis Collectibles, Inc is a rare comic book dealer of vintage American comics, primarily known for its large collection of comic books originally published in the 1930s, 1940s, 1950s, 1960s and 1970s. The company is located on Broadway in New York City, and the comic book showroom allows viewings by appointment only. In addition to being comic book buyers and comic book sellers, Metropolis also gives comic book appraisals and provides comic book valuation services of rare, old out-of-print comics.

== History ==
Metropolis was founded in 1984 by Stephen Fishler, and merged in 1999 with Vincent Zurzolo, Jr., of Vincent's Collectibles; Zurzolo said that as he found he could not compete with Fishler's business, so merging the two made sense.

Over the years, Metropolis Collectibles has grown from being a comic book mail-order company to maintaining a major online retail presence. Metropolis Collectibles has obtained a variety of notable classic comic book collections over the years, or "pedigrees", including the Crowley Collection, the Allentown Pedigree, the D-Copy Collection, and the Northford Collection.

In August 2014, the company was able to purchase a near-mint copy of Action Comics #1 (CGC 9.0) for $3.2 million in an auction on eBay.

In July 2007, the owners and staff of Metropolis Collectibles started a separate entity, a sister company called Comic Connect, Corp. Unlike the parent company, this website gives users the ability to list their own comic for sale, and to buy/sell comic books from each other, and is positioned as an alternative to eBay and comic book auctions.

== Grading scale ==
Metropolis founder Stephen Fishler is credited with creating the 10 point grading scale that is used industry wide for valuing comic books. He did not create the nomenclature grades (e.g. Very Fine, Near Mint), but organized what was once a 42-point system into the 10-point grading scale, which he convinced the Overstreet Comic Book Price Guide to adopt, and was later embraced by the Certified Guaranty Company (CGC) for their own 3rd Party Grading Services.
