= Our Gods Wear Spandex =

2007 book by Christopher Knowles

- The cover of Our Gods Wear Spandex by Roland Friedrich
- Author: Christopher Knowles
- Illustrator: Joe Linsner
- Cover artist: Roland Friedrich
- Language: English
- Subject: Superheroes
- Publisher: Weiser
- Publication date: 2007
- Publication place: United States
- Media type: Print
- Pages: 256
- ISBN: 1-57863-406-7
- OCLC: 137246002
- Dewey Decimal: 741.5/352 22
- LC Class: PN6714 .K56 2007

Our Gods Wear Spandex: The Secret History of Comic Book Heroes is a 2007 book by Christopher Knowles, the former editor of Comic Book Artist, with illustrations by Joe Linsner.

The book examines superheroes as a modern evolution of mythological archetypes and the more modern history, as well as the mystical influences on comics.

== Overview ==
The book looks at the evolution of the superhero through the early Egyptian, Greek and Roman myths to the modern era. In particular Knowles highlights the significance of Edward Bulwer-Lytton's novel The Coming Race and its concept of the Vril-ya, a super human race occupying the Hollow Earth. This was adopted and adapted by Theosophy into their concept of Ascended Masters which when mixed with Friedrich Nietzsche's Übermensch, became the template for the early superheroes. It then goes on to examine the influences of the pulp magazines on the development of what we would come to view as superheroes, looking at specific examples like The Shadow and Doc Savage.

The book breaks down superheroes into four main archetypes

- Magic Men - the Wizard figure, from Mandrake the Magician and Doctor Occult through Doctor Strange to John Constantine but also including a lot of early superheroes whose Golden Age origins were magical, like Captain Marvel and Green Lantern.
- Messiahs - the "noble self-sacrificing hero who acts to save others out of a sense of altruism" with main example being one of the first: Superman; but it also includes Spider-Man and Captain America.
- Amazons - the female counterpart, like Wonder Woman.
- Golems - the antiheroes who either "act out of need for vengeance" (Batman) or "are berserkers, whose rage causes them to kill indiscriminately" (Punisher or Wolverine).

It also examines the religious, mystical and occult influences on comics writers like Jack Kirby, Alan Moore and Grant Morrison.

Knowles has further expanded on his ideas, in particular looking at Action Comics #1 and its similarities with Hercules and the Hydra by Antonio del Pollaiuolo. He also runs The Sacred Sun blog which also returns to the theme, especially in connection with Jack Kirby and the influences of ideas like the Ancient Astronaut Theory on his work, even series seemingly unconnected to it such as Devil Dinosaur, a topic Knowles has written about for The Jack Kirby Collector.

The themes the book raises have also been the focus of a number of panels at comics conventions. A. David Lewis, who has organised similar panels looking at religion and comics, organised one at New York Comic Con in 2008, with G. Willow Wilson, Douglas Rushkoff and Dennis O'Neil. Another was held on February 24, 2008 at WonderCon.

== Reception ==
Sequential Tart was impressed by the amount of information saying that "after reading it I believe I could perform fairly well in a comic book history trivia contest." Despite that it remains accessible, the "book is written in a way that is understandable to almost anyone who has only a basic knowledge of comic books" and their "only problem with Knowles' writing is that it seemed to jump around a bit, especially the first half." Steve Bennett, at ICv2, said it was "the best book on the subject I've read since Gerard Jones' landmark Men of Tomorrow."

Other reviewers, however, were less impressed. Publishers Weekly said that "[n]ot only does Knowles fail to make a persuasive case for his theories about the genre’s occult origins, but he repeatedly shoots himself in the foot with wild overstatements." The Daily Telegraph said "[t]his kind of thinking, along with most of Knowles's book, is not news to academics or fans" and concludes that it is a "fun, fluent book, but not the breakthrough popular history that the subject deserves."

== Awards ==
- 2008: Won "Favourite Comics-Related Book" Eagle Award
