= Certified Guaranty Company =

American comic book grading service

Certified Guaranty Company, LLC
- Type: Private
- Industry: Collectibles
- Founded: January 4, 2000; 26 years ago Parsippany, New Jersey, U.S.
- Headquarters: Sarasota, Florida, U.S.
- Area served: Worldwide
- Services: Collectibles grading
- Parent: Certified Collectibles Group
- Website: www.cgccomics.com

Certified Guaranty Company, also known as CGC, is a Sarasota, Florida collectibles grading company specializing in comic books and trading cards. CGC is an independent member of the Certified Collectibles Group of companies.

The company was launched in early 2000 and has since gone on to become a significant part of the comic book collecting community. As of 2021, they have graded over 7 million comic books as well as some of the most expensive CCG cards.

== Process ==
Comic books are sent to CGC for grading and encapsulation either directly by the owner through CGC's website or through an authorized dealer. People sending in comics themselves can get a 10% discount from CGC by using the "Internet Partners" links on their submission page. Comics may also be submitted to the company from an individual who signs up for one of their three paid membership options. The company also accepts submissions in person by sending representatives to several comic book conventions. Upon receipt, the comics are inspected by one pre-grader for obvious defects (missing pages, etc.) and are then graded by three graders in a temperature- and humidity-controlled environment. The grades are not averaged together, as The Head Grader determines the final grade. This means that if two graders rate a book at 7.0, for example, and the Head Grader grades it a 7.5, the latter grade prevails. The graders look for damage and signs of restoration. The comic books are then graded on a scale from 0.5 to 10. These numbers correspond with more traditional descriptive grades such as "very fine", "near mint", and "mint", with the higher numbers indicating a better grade.

In addition to the numeric grade, CGC also uses color-coded labels to categorize comics:

Grading label colors and descriptions
Label
Description
Universal (blue)
A standard comic book
Universal (blue) No Grade (NG)
A comic book that is in such poor condition that CGC will not give it a grade, but merely verify that it is an actual original comic book. CGC will slab pages of a comic book in this manner.
Conserved (blue/purple)
A book that has specific repairs done to improve the structural integrity and long-term preservation. These repairs include tear seals, support, staple replacement, piece reattachment and certain kinds of cleaning.
Restored (purple)
a book that has evidence of restoration, either amateur (A) or professional (P), combined with the descriptors slight (S), moderate (M), or extensive (E)
Qualified (green)
A book with a significant defect that needs specific description or one with an unauthenticated signature

For example, an otherwise "near mint" condition book with a 4-inch back cover tear would be given a Qualified grade of "9.0, back cover 4-inch tear."

Signature Series (yellow)
A book signed by someone of significance to the comic, as witnessed by an employee of CGC, and the signature certified as authentic.
Signature Series Restored (yellow/purple)
a book with a signature that has been authenticated, and is showing evidence of restoration
Modern (red)
No longer in use, originally used to distinguish modern comics *CGC will accept receipt of previously "RED" labeled books to be encapsulated in a new container and labeled with a blue label at the same grade.
Wizard First (red and white)
No longer in use, originally used by CGC/Wizard magazine as a new type of slabbed collectible. Only three grades were given to comics submitted by Wizard directly to CGC: 9.0, 9.5, and 10.0. This is the only time CGC has ever used the grade "9.5".

CGC Standard Grading Scale
Grade & Numeric Grade	Description
Gem Mint 10	The highest grade assigned. The collectible must have no evidence of any manufacturing or handling defects.
Mint 9.9	The collectible is nearly indistinguishable from a 10.0 but will have a very minor manufacturing defect. It will not have any evidence of handling defects.
NM/M 9.8	A nearly perfect collectible with negligible handling or manufacturing defects.
NM+ 9.6	A very well-preserved collectible with several minor manufacturing or handling defects.
NM (Near Mint) 9.4	A very well-preserved collectible with minor wear and small manufacturing or handling defects.
NM- 9.2	A very well-preserved collectible with some wear and small manufacturing or handling defects.
VF/NM 9.0	A very well-preserved collectible with good eye appeal. There will be a number of minor handling and/or manufacturing defects. This is the grade at which Action Comics #1 was graded at and sold for more than $3 million for a single original copy.
VF+ 8.5	An attractive collectible with a moderate defect or a number of small defects.
VF (Very Fine) 8.0	An attractive collectible with a moderate defect or an accumulation of small defects.
VF- 7.5	An above-average collectible with a moderate defect or an accumulation of small defects.
FN/VF 7.0	An above-average collectible with a major defect or an accumulation of small defects.
FN+ 6.5	An above-average collectible with a major defect and some smaller defects, or a significant accumulation of small defects.
FN (Fine) 6.0	A slightly above-average collectible with a major defect and some smaller defects, or a significant accumulation of small defects.
FN- 5.5	A slightly above-average collectible with several moderate defects.
VG/FN 5.0	An average collectible with several moderate defects.
VG+ 4.5	A slightly below-average collectible with multiple moderate defects.
VG (Very Good) 4.0	A below-average collectible with multiple moderate defects.
VG- 3.5	A below-average collectible with several major defects or an accumulation of multiple moderate defects.
G/VG 3.0	A collectible that shows significant evidence of handling with several moderate-to-major defects.
G (Good) 2.5-2.0	A collectible that shows extensive evidence of handling with multiple to numerous moderate-to-major defects.
G- 1.8	A collectible that shows extensive evidence of handling with numerous major defects.
Fa/G 1.5	A collectible that shows extensive evidence of handling with a heavy accumulation of major defects.
Fa (Fair) 1.0	A very poorly handled collectible with a heavy accumulation of major defects.
Poor <0.5	A heavily defaced collectible with a number major defects. Some pieces will also be missing.

After grading, the comics are placed in an inner well, a sealed sleeve of Barex, a highly gas-impermeable plastic polymer. Then, the comics are sonically sealed in a hard plastic, tamper-evident holder. This process is often referred to in comics jargon as "slabbing". A label is affixed at the top indicating the title, date, grade, page quality, and any notes, such as notable creators. Books which would be damaged by encapsulation are returned without this process.

== Purpose of grading services ==
Prior to advent of grading and authentication services, both buyers and sellers were vulnerable to misrepresentation in the marketplace. Seller could benefit from overstating the quality of a book's condition to inflate the price, while a buyer could dispute the condition of a book with the intention of purchasing at a lower price. While reputation scores in online marketplaces can disincentivize repeat offenders by lowering their scores, collectors lacked a reliable, low effort way to ensure a comic book being sold matches the listing's stated quality. Grading services aim to provide consistent, objective grading and authentication, which can mitigate the risk of misrepresentation otherwise inherent with comic book collecting.

=== Grading ===
Condition is a significant factor in the valuation of a comic book. An example is Action Comics #1, the first published appearance of Superman. In 2010, two copies sold on the comic book auction website comicconnect.com for record prices. One copy was CGC graded 8.0 and sold for US$1 million. The second book at a later auction, a copy CGC graded at 8.5 sold for a record-setting $1.5 million, the most ever paid up to that time for a comic book. A 9.0-rated version sold at a 2014 auction for $3.2 million. This underscores CGC's ability to provide a grading service as a neutral third party from a transaction, this created a degree of impartiality that did not exist before. This has shown that there is a demand for graded books as consistently these books have set sales records.

=== Signatures ===
CGCs gold label Signature Series is a signature validation service in which a CGC representative witnesses a comic being signed by a specific individual as requested by the comic book's owner. Furthermore, the CGC establishes a chain of custody of that specific comic until it is “slabbed” and subsequently returned to the individual who ordered the signature series grading and verification. This mitigates signature forgery concerns.

=== Identifying restoration and counterfeits ===
For highly valued comics, a higher grade can result in a price difference of thousands of dollars. Similarly, a comic book marked by CGC with the purple "Restored" label can suffer a significant price reduction.

== See also ==
- List of most expensive CCG cards
- List of most expensive comic books
