= Angelo Colarossi =

British model (1875–1949)

Angelo Colarossi (1875–1949) was a studio boy and assistant to the sculptor Alfred Gilbert. At the age of 15, he modelled for Gilbert's most famous statue Anteros (1891) on the Shaftesbury Memorial Fountain in Piccadilly Circus. He was later employed by an English firm of aircraft manufacturers.

== Life ==
Angelo Colarossi the younger was one of six or more children born to Angelo Colarossi, Sr. (c. 1838–1916), and Mary Ann Gorman in West London. The family lived at 14, Masboro Road West, in the Brook Green area of Hammersmith, and is recorded there in the 1881 census. Angelo Colarossi, senior, had been an artist's model himself, and his son was following in the father's footsteps. Whilst the boy is remembered chiefly for the delicate figure in Piccadilly Circus, the father was the model for several powerful expressions of masculinity, such as An Athlete Wrestling with a Python by Frederic, Lord Leighton.

Alfred Gilbert was commissioned to sculpt a memorial to Anthony Ashley-Cooper, the 7th Earl of Shaftesbury, in 1886. For five years Gilbert considered various ideas to celebrate the charitable life of the Earl. He eventually decided on an ornate fountain, topped with the winged figure of Anteros, the ancient Greek symbol of Selfless Love. The aluminium figure of the youth, caught is if he were almost in flight, has an outstretched bow arm and extended opposing leg. The Anteros figure is eight feet in height, weighs nearly three hundredweight (approximately 150Kg).

The Colarossi boy posed for Gilbert's Anteros in the artist's studio at 8, The Avenue. The painter John Singer Sargent later occupied studios adjacent to Gilbert's. Gilbert befriended Sargent, who was working on the murals for Boston Library, and Sargent made studies for the figure of Moses using Colarossi's father, who had been a model in his own right, before the Colarossi boy modelled for Gilbert.

A contemporary of Gilbert's, John William Waterhouse also seems to have employed Angelo Colarossi senior (1839–1916) as one of his models. It is not known if the younger Colarossi ever posed for Waterhouse, but as the boy never grew over five feet tall, suggestions that he was the model for one of the youths that feature in Waterhouse's paintings of the early 1890s seem reasonable.

== Later life ==
Both father and son posed for Frederick Leighton's monumental canvas 'And the sea gave up the dead which were in it' (Tate Collection), providing a useful record of how they looked at the time. At the time of his marriage in Fulham in 1904, Colarossi gave his profession as 'Solicitor's clerk' and he gave the same profession at the time of the 1911 census. He later went to work in an aircraft factory. He is buried in Feltham Cemetery, which is seven or so acres in area and witnessed its first burial in 1886.

== Other family members ==
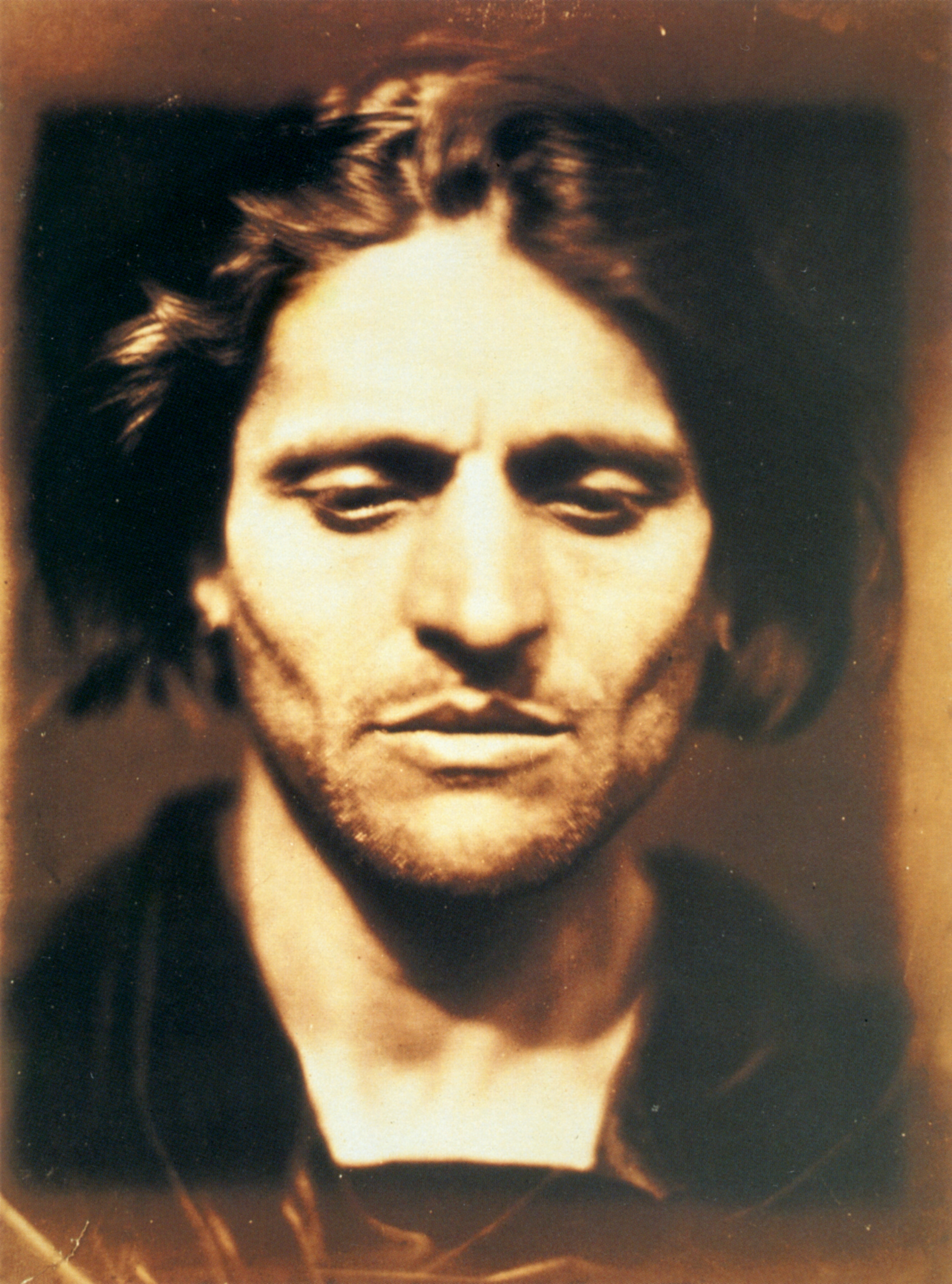
Julia Margaret Cameron's 1867 photograph "Iago, Study from an Italian", identified by Colin Ford as Angelo Colarossi senior

Angelo was reputedly the nephew of Filippo Colarossi, a sculptor who was manager of the famous Académie Colarossi, an art school in Paris, whose students included Amedeo Modigliani and Alphonse Mucha. This claim is made in the 1929 biography of Alfred Gilbert by Isabel McAllister. Located at 10 rue de la Grande-Chaumière in Paris, France, it was established in the 19th century as an alternative to the government sanctioned École des Beaux Arts

Colin Ford erroneously identified Angelo Colarossi senior with the model in Julia Margaret Cameron's 1860s photograph 'Iago', after comparing the portrait with other likenesses of Colarossi. However the named drawing of Colarossi shows a heavily moustached man; aside from Frederick Leighton, everybody else depicted Colarossi with his moustache. The lack of a moustache suggests that Cameron's 'Iago' is, if not Angelo Colarossi senior, then possibly a portrait of a Colarossi brother. Earlier references give the model's name as Alessandro; Angelo Colarossi senior may have had a brother named Alessandro – he certainly had an Alessandro and an Angelo as sons. If this is the case, Cameron's 'Iago' would be a picture of our Angelo's uncle. New evidence in a recently published article in the British Art Journal suggests that Alessandro di Marco was in fact the model for the photograph and not Colarossi as previously thought.

Angelo's parents were married in 1867, by which time they already had one son Fiori Albert Colarossi, born in 1866. He appears in the 1881 census as Albert and was married in Chelsea in 1905. There was a sister Marie Augustina Colarossi, who appears in the 1881 census as Mari, and married Ferdinando Belisario in 1887.

The next two children: Antonio Colarossi and Antonio Angelo Colarossi both died as infants. Angelo was next, followed by another sister, Mary Ann Rosa Colarossi, shown as Rosa in the 1881 census. She was married in Fulham in 1905. After Rosa came Lorenzo Alfonso Colarossi, born in 1879, who appears in the census as Laurence. He was followed in early 1881 by Alessandro Gilbert Colarossi, who is shown as an unnamed infant just 7 days old in the 1881 census. According to family sources, he later moved to America and died in Pennsylvania, in 1953. Apparently the last of the family was Mabel Colarossi, born in Fulham in 1884, however not all the Colarossi children's births were registered.

== Sources ==
Colin Ford CBE has researched extensively into Angelo Colarossi and his family.

- Mrs A. M. W. Stirling – 'The Richmond Papers', London, 1926;
- Isabel McAllister – 'Alfred Gilbert', London, 1929;
- Martin Chisholm – 'The Man who was Eros', Picture Post, 28 June 1947;
- Leonée & Richard Ormond – 'Lord Leighton', London, 1975;
- Various Authors – 'Victorian High Renaissance', Minneapolis Institute of Arts. 1979;
- Anthony Hobson – 'The Art and Life of J. W. Waterhouse RA, 1849–1917', London' 1980;
- Richard Dorment – 'Alfred Gilbert', Yale, 1985;
- Richard Dorment – 'Alfred Gilbert, Sculptor and Goldsmith', Royal Academy of Arts, London, 1986;
- Edward J. Nygren – 'John Singer Sargent Drawings from the Corcoran Gallery of Art', Smithsonian Institution, 1993;
- Simon Reynolds – 'William Blake Richmond – An Artist's Life, 1842–1921', Norwich, 1995;
- Benedict Read – 'Leighton as a Sculptor, Lord Leighton and Leighton House – A Centenary Celebration', Apollo Magazine, 1996;
- David M. Wilson – 'Vikings and Gods in European Art', Moesgård Museum, 1997;
- Caroline Dakers – 'The Holland Park Circle' – Artists and Victorian Society, Yale, 1999;
- Martin Postle & William Vaughan – 'The Artist's Model from Etty to Spencer', London, 1999;
- Jill Berk Jiminez – 'Dictionary of Artists' Models', London/Chicago, 2001;
- Peter Trippi – 'J. W. Waterhouse', London, 2002;
- Colin Ford – 'Mountain Nymph' and 'Damnèd Villain', History of Photography, Volume 27, Number 1, Spring 2003;
- Simon Toll – 'Herbert Draper, 1863–1920, A Life Study', Antique Collectors Club, 2003.
