= Hercules Slaying Antaeus =

Painting by Antonio del Pollaiuolo

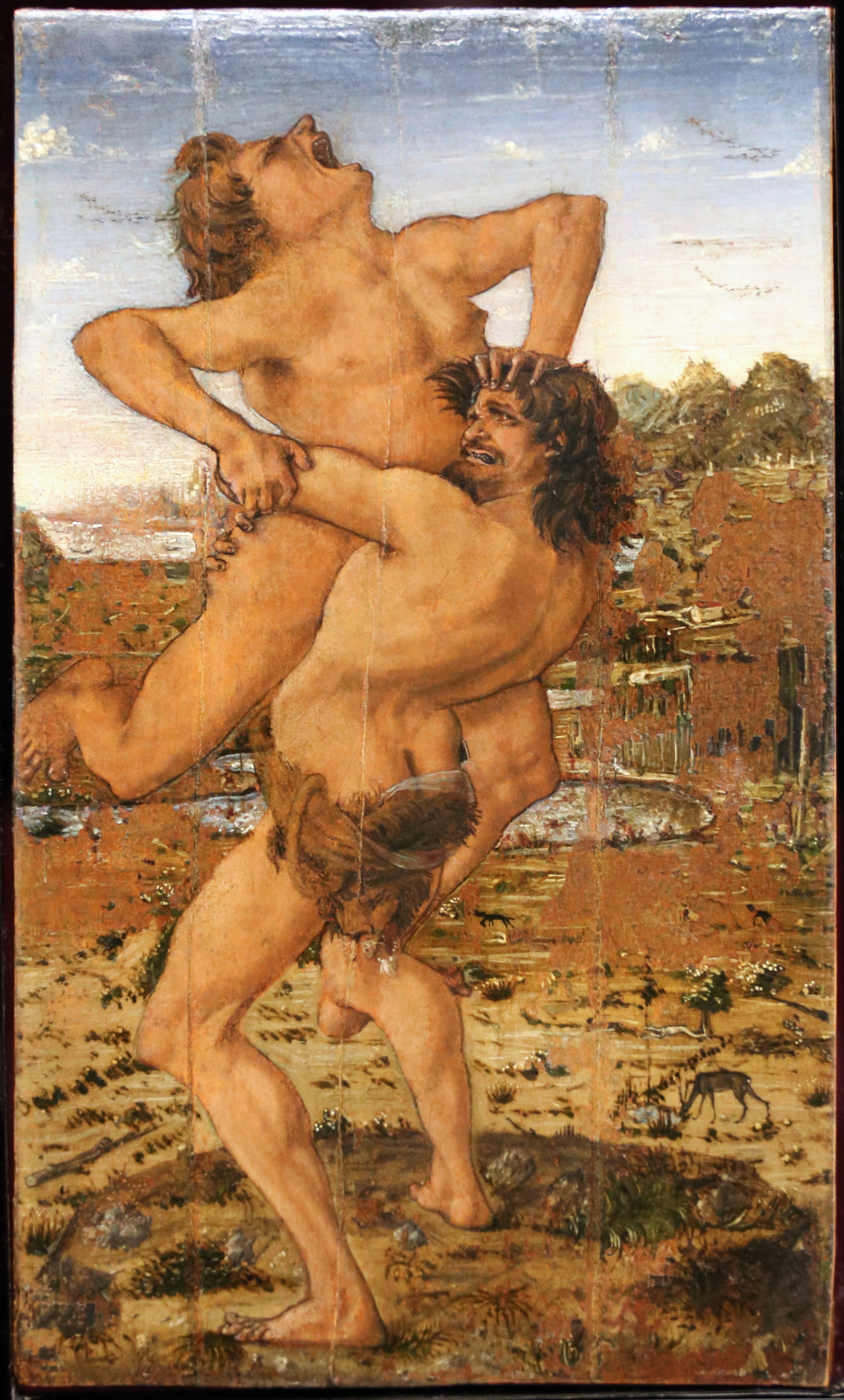
Hercules slaying Antaeus: Hercules found that each time he felled Antaeus, he got up again, renewed by contact with the earth – Gaia, his mother, refreshing him – so Hercules had to hold him off the ground while squeezing him to death.

Hercules slaying Antaeus, c. 1460, is a painting by the Florentine artist Antonio del Pollaiuolo. It is small at 6 x 3 1/2 inches, painted in egg tempera on a panel of wood. It is now in the Uffizi Gallery, Florence.

The painting shows the mythical giant Antaeus, son of Gaia, goddess of the Earth, being crushed to death in the arms of Heracles. Hercules was a Florentine hero, regarded as an image of the Florentine state – its ruthless and warlike spirit – which furthered its political and economic success.

It is assumed that both this and Hercules Slaying the Hydra are miniature copies by the artist of two out of the three enormous (some 12 feet square) paintings on canvas of the Labours of Hercules commissioned from Antonio and Piero del Pollaiuolo by Piero di Cosimo de' Medici for the Sala Grande of the Palazzo Medici in the 1460s, which have now been lost.

== Large originals ==
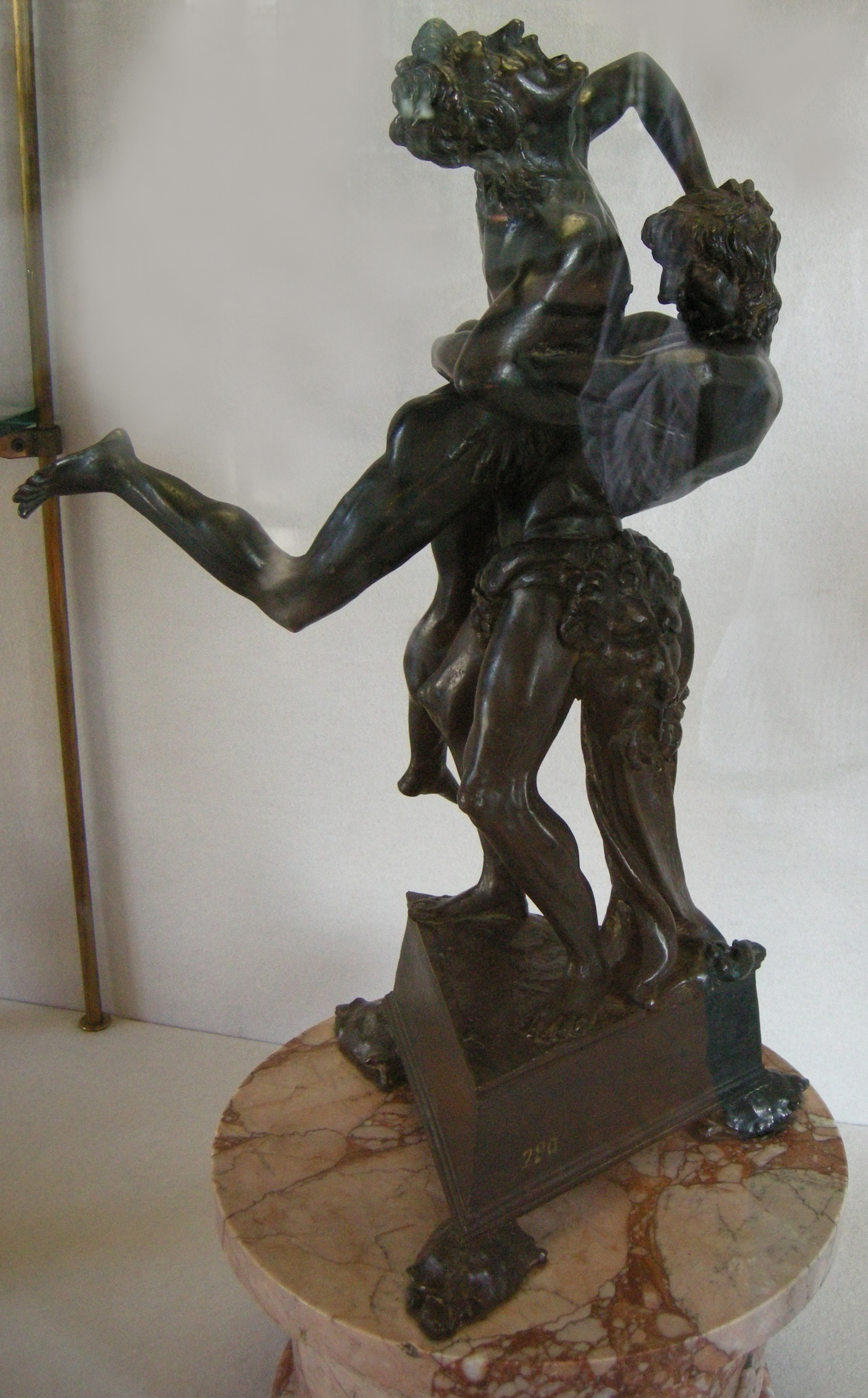
Hercules and Antaeus, Bargello

A series of three large canvases illustrating the legends surrounding the figure of Hercules were painted by the Pollaiulo brothers – Antonio and Piero – for the Sala Grande of the Palazzo Medici and this painting appears to be a small-scale copy of one of the series. The originals were in a large room designed to impress visitors. They were 6 braccia square or high—about 3.5 metres (11 ft), on cloth, so with over-life size figures; Hercules and the Nemean lion was the third. For some fifty years after their completion, these "were amongst the most famous and influential works of their time", but are now lost, "like nearly every canvas of the date".

These were done around 1460, very early in Antonio's independent career, and must have loudly announced his arrival as a painter to Florence and beyond. They were perhaps commissioned by Piero di Cosimo de' Medici rather than his father, and were on cloth, still relatively unusual in Florence at this date.

In 1494, Antonio Pollaiulo wrote a letter from Rome, the city at the time in the grip of an outbreak of plague, asking to be allowed home to Tuscany and hoping the Medicis would consent to the request because – "34 years ago I made the Labours of Hercules which are in the hall of their palace, made by me and my brother."

Giorgio Vasari, the Florentine art historian praised the series of paintings and particularly praised Hercules Slaying Antaeus – "In the Medici palace Antonio painted three Hercules scenes of five braccia (about six feet across). In one of them he strangles Antaeus, a most beautiful picture, in which one can really see Hercules's effort in the strangling – And no less care is used for Antaeus, who, held tight in the arms of Hercules, is seen to lose all strength and with open mouth give up the ghost."

Antonio del Pollaiuolo also made a small "table bronze" sculpture of the same couple; Hercules features in others of his paintings and sculptures.

== Small versions ==
The two small Uffizi works are first definitively recorded in a 1609 inventory of works in the Gondi household in Florence, by which time they had been joined together to form a diptych despite originally being separate works with different horizon lines.

The paintings disappeared during the German occupation of Florence in 1943 during World War II. Both re-emerged in San Francisco, in the mid-1960s, and were returned to Florence.
