= Christopher Knowles (comics) =

American artist and writer (born 1966)

- Born: 1966 (age 59–60)
- Occupations: comic book artist, writer, blogger
- Years active: 1996 – present
- Notable work: Our Gods Wear Spandex

Christopher Knowles (/noʊlz/; born 1966) is an American comic book artist, writer and blogger who writes on comic books and broader pop culture topics.

== Career ==
Knowles began his career in 1996, writing and drawing comics, particularly, Halo, an Angel's Story, a mini-series published by Sirius Entertainment, and contributing to the art in a graphic novel based on the Saturday Night Live cartoon The X Presidents. He was also the editor of the Top Shelf Productions magazine Comic Book Artist from 2000 to 2004 and has written articles for publications such as The Jack Kirby Collector and sites like Comic Book Resources.

Knowles wrote a book called Our Gods Wear Spandex: The Secret History of Comic Book Heroes (2007), which won an Eagle Award for "Favourite Comics-Related Book". He co-authored a book published in 2008 about The X-Files TV series called The Complete X-Files: Behind the Series, the Myths, and the Movies. In October 2010, Viva Editions published his latest book, The Secret History of Rock 'n' Roll, which Voice of America says presents rock and roll as having its roots "in the mystery cults of the ancient world", then "follows the evolution of rock 'n' roll from an expression of youthful rebellion to a symbol of American culture."

Since November 2007 Knowles has been blogging on topics related to his books.

== Bibliography ==
=== Comics ===
- "Fix" (script and art, in Negative Burn #41, Caliber Comics, 1996)
- Halo, an Angel’s Story (script and pencils, Sirius Entertainment, 4-issue mini-series, 1996)
- The X Presidents (pencils, with authors Robert Smigel/Adam McKay, graphic novel, 80 pages, Villard, October 2000, ISBN 0-679-78362-8)
- Prime8: Creation (TwoMorrows Publishing, July 2001)

=== Books ===
- Knowles, Christopher (November 2007). Our Gods Wear Spandex: The Secret History of Comic Book Heroes. Joseph Michael Linsner (illustrator). Red Wheel/Weiser/Conari. ISBN 1-57863-406-7.
- Knowles, Christopher; Matt Hurwitz (November 2008). The Complete X-Files: Behind the Series, the Myths, and the Movies. Insight Editions. ISBN 1-933784-72-5.
- Knowles, Christopher (October 2010). The Secret History of Rock 'n' Roll. Viva Editions. ISBN 1-57344-405-7.
- Christopher Loring Knowles (2020). The Endless American Midnight. ISBN 979- 8692403704
