= Hercules and the Hydra (Pollaiuolo) =

Painting by Antonio del Pollaiuolo

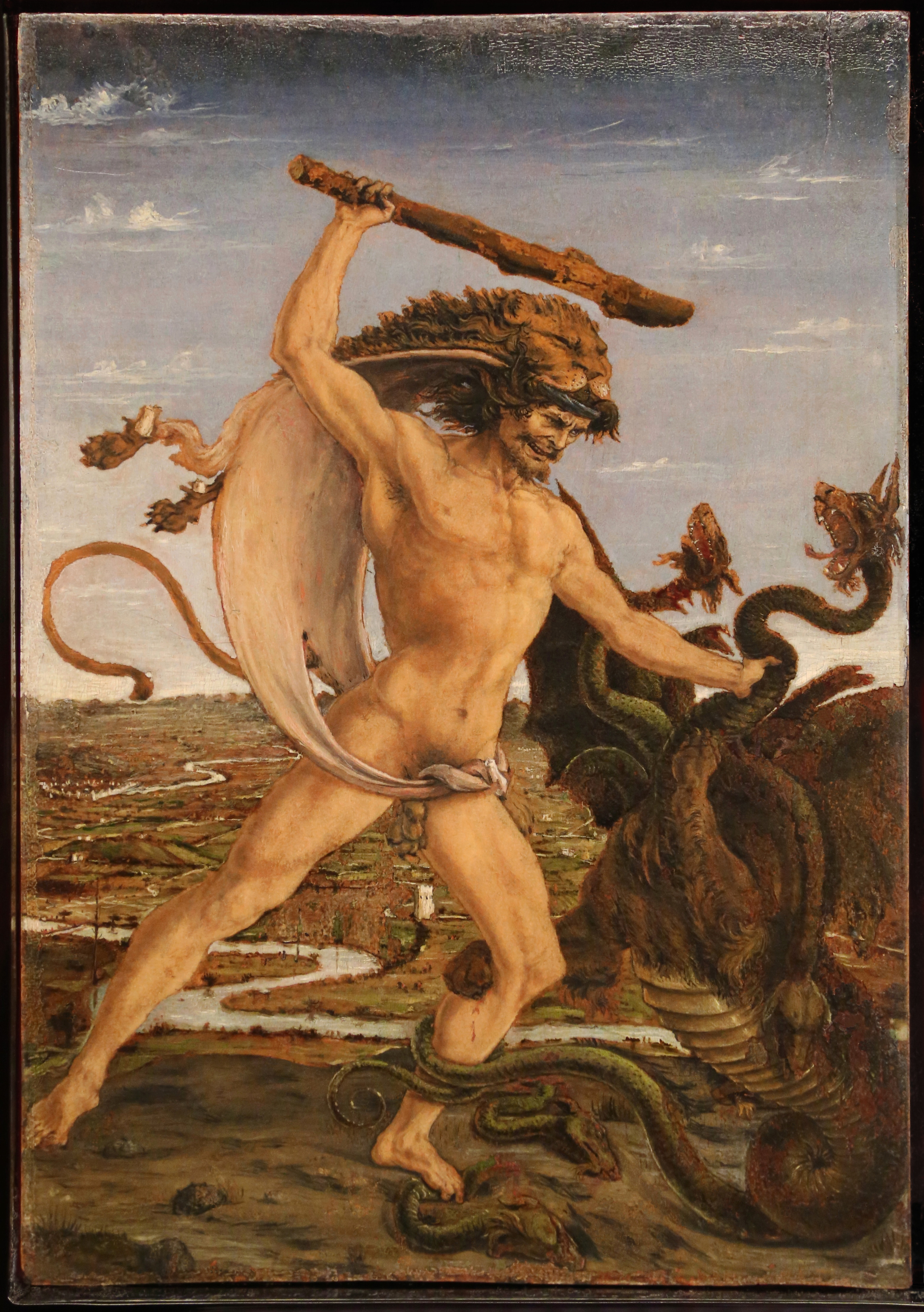
Hercules and the Hydra (c. 1475) by Antonio del Pollaiuolo

Hercules and the Hydra is a c. 1475 tempera grassa-on-panel painting by Antonio del Pollaiuolo, forming a pair with the same artist's Hercules Slaying Antaeus. Both works are now in the Galleria degli Uffizi in Florence. It measures 17 cm (6.6 in) by 12 cm (4.7 in), small like all his surviving mythological paintings.

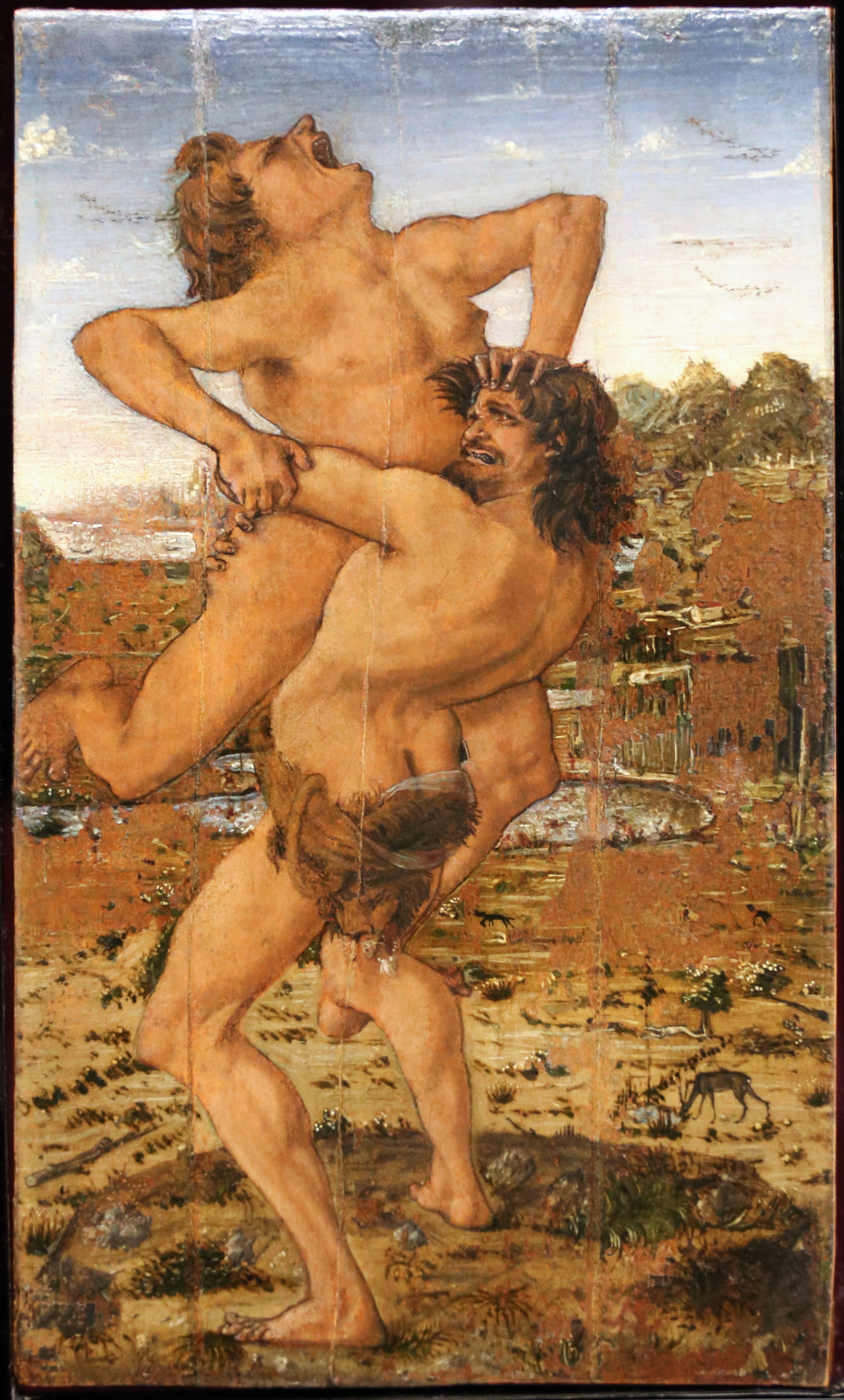
Hercules Slaying Antaeus: Hercules found that each time he felled Antaeus, he got up again, renewed by contact with the earth – Gaia, his mother, refreshing him – so Hercules had to hold him off the ground while squeezing him to death

== The large originals ==
It is assumed that both these are miniature copies by the artist of two out of the three enormous paintings on canvas of the Labours of Hercules commissioned from Antonio and Piero del Pollaiuolo probably by Piero di Cosimo de' Medici (rather than by his father) for the Palazzo Medici in the 1460s.

The originals were displayed in the Sala Grande designed to impress visitors. They were 6 braccia square or high—about 3.5 metres (some 12 feet square), so with over-life size figures; Hercules and the Nemean lion was the third. For some fifty years after their completion, these "were amongst the most famous and influential works of their time", but are now lost, "like nearly every canvas of the date". Paintings on cloth were still relatively unusual in Florence at that time.

In 1494, Antonio Pollaiulo wrote a letter to Gentile Virginio Orsini from Rome, which was at the time in the grip of an outbreak of plague, asking to be allowed home to Tuscany and hoping the Medicis would consent to the request because – "34 years ago I made the Labours of Hercules which are in the hall of their palace, made by me and my brother." They were in the Palazzo Medici inventory after the death of Lorenzo the Magnificent.

Giorgio Vasari, the Florentine art historian praised the series of paintings in his Vite (1550/1568):

"In the Medici Palace he painted three pictures for Lorenzo the elder, each containing a figure of Hercules, five braccia high. In the first is seen the hero strangling Antaeus; the figure of Hercules is very fine, and the force employed by him in crushing his antagonist is clearly apparent, every muscle and nerve of the body being strained to ensure the destruction of his opponent. The teeth, firmly set, are in perfect accord with the expression of the other parts of the figure, all of which, even to the points of the feet on which he raises himself, give manifest intimation of the efforts used. Nor is less care displayed in the figure of Antaeus, who, pressed by the arms of Hercules, is seen to be sinking and deprived of all power of resistance, his mouth is open, he is breathing his last sigh.

In the second figure, Hercules is killing the Lion; he presses the left knee against the chest of the animal, whose jaws he has seized with both hands; grinding his teeth and extending his arms, he tears the mouth open and rives the creature asunder by main force, although the lion defends himself with his claws and is fiercely tearing the arm of his assailant.

The third picture, in which the hero is destroying the Hydra, is indeed an admirable work, more especially as regards the reptile, the colouring of which has so much animation and truth, that nothing more life-like could possibly be seen; the venomous nature, the fire, the ferocity, and the rage of the monster are so effectually displayed, that the master merits the highest encomiums, and deserves to be imitated in this respect by all good artists."

They were mentioned again in Raffaello Borghini's Riposo of 1584 before vanishing from the documentary record.

They show the influence of the Neoplatonic Academy, harking back to classical art and interpreting Greek and Roman myth in the light of Christian philosophy.

== The miniatures ==
Possibly produced for a private study, the two works now in the Uffizi are now generally thought to be copies after two of the works in the Labours set, done many years later, possibly for the Medici. One relates to Antonio's bronze sculpture Hercules Slaying Antaeus, which was commissioned by Lorenzo around 1475 and is now in the Museo nazionale del Bargello.

The two paintings in the Uffizi are first definitively recorded in a 1609 inventory of works in the Gondi household in Florence, by which time they had been joined to form a diptych despite originally being separate works with different horizon lines. They were lost in 1943 during the Second World War but recovered in Los Angeles in 1963 by Rodolfo Siviero. They were restored in 1991.
